= Arrondissement of Bourg-en-Bresse =

Coordinates: 46°12′36″N 5°14′15″E

Bourg-en-Bresse
- Arrondissement
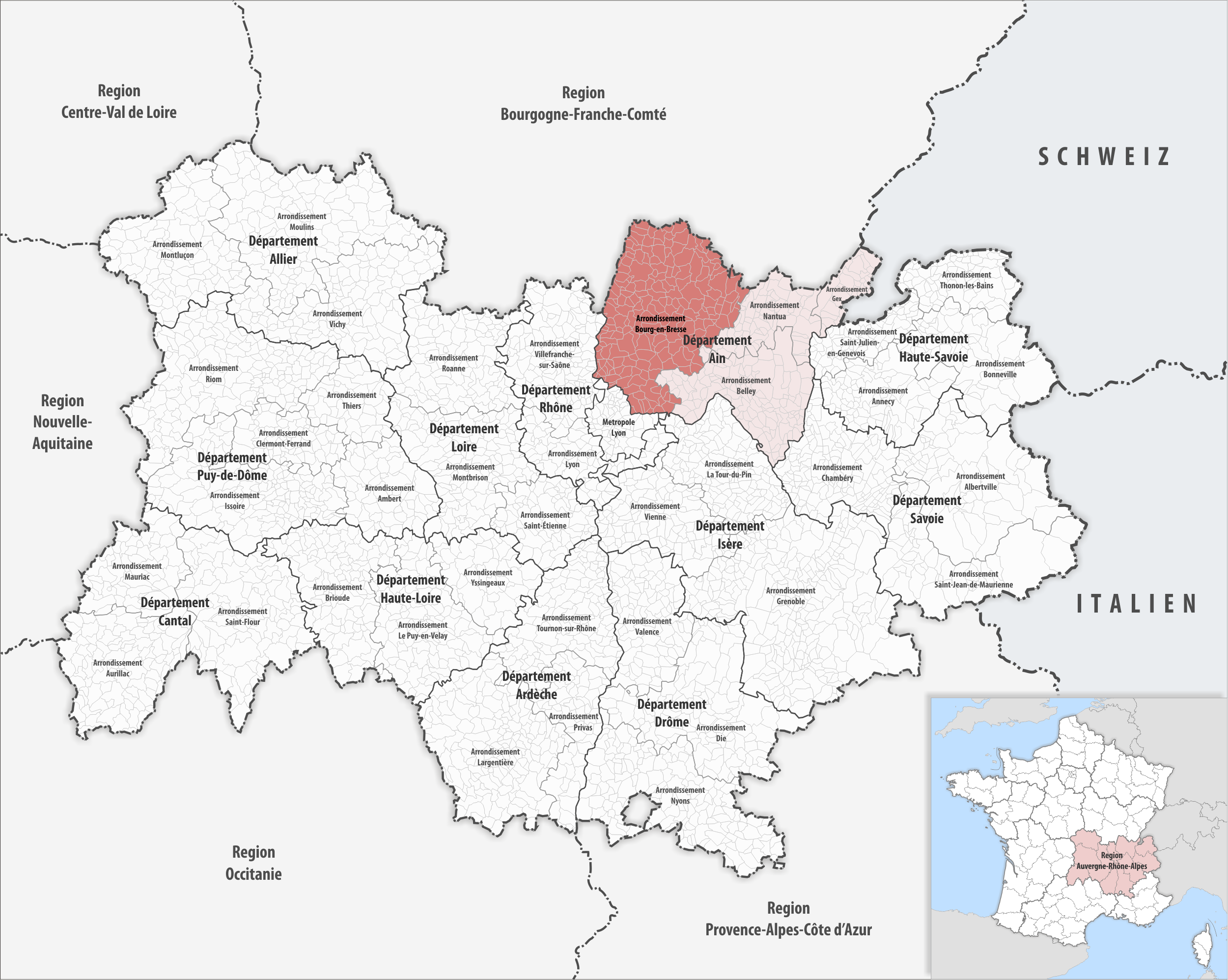
- Location within the region Auvergne-Rhône-Alpes
- Country: France
- Region: Auvergne-Rhône-Alpes
- Department: Ain
- No. of communes: {{{nbcomm}}}
- Area: 2,873.7 km^{2} (1,109.5 sq mi)
- Population (2023): 349,343
  - Density: 121.57/km^{2} (314.85/sq mi)
- INSEE code: 012

The arrondissement of Bourg-en-Bresse is an arrondissement of France in the Ain department in the Auvergne-Rhône-Alpes region. It has 199 communes. Its population is 342,454 (2021), and its area is 2,873.7 km^{2} (1,109.5 sq mi).

== Composition ==
The communes of the arrondissement of Bourg-en-Bresse, and their INSEE codes, are:

1. L'Abergement-Clémenciat (01001)
2. Ambérieux-en-Dombes (01005)
3. Arbigny (01016)
4. Ars-sur-Formans (01021)
5. Asnières-sur-Saône (01023)
6. Attignat (01024)
7. Bâgé-Dommartin (01025)
8. Bâgé-le-Châtel (01026)
9. Balan (01027)
10. Baneins (01028)
11. Beaupont (01029)
12. Beauregard (01030)
13. Béligneux (01032)
14. Bény (01038)
15. Béréziat (01040)
16. Bey (01042)
17. Beynost (01043)
18. Birieux (01045)
19. Biziat (01046)
20. Bohas-Meyriat-Rignat (01245)
21. La Boisse (01049)
22. Boissey (01050)
23. Bouligneux (01052)
24. Bourg-en-Bresse (01053)
25. Boz (01057)
26. Bresse Vallons (01130)
27. Bressolles (01062)
28. Buellas (01065)
29. Certines (01069)
30. Ceyzériat (01072)
31. Chalamont (01074)
32. Chaleins (01075)
33. Chaneins (01083)
34. Chanoz-Châtenay (01084)
35. La Chapelle-du-Châtelard (01085)
36. Châtenay (01090)
37. Châtillon-la-Palud (01092)
38. Châtillon-sur-Chalaronne (01093)
39. Chavannes-sur-Reyssouze (01094)
40. Chaveyriat (01096)
41. Chevroux (01102)
42. Civrieux (01105)
43. Cize (01106)
44. Coligny (01108)
45. Condeissiat (01113)
46. Confrançon (01115)
47. Cormoranche-sur-Saône (01123)
48. Cormoz (01124)
49. Corveissiat (01125)
50. Courmangoux (01127)
51. Courtes (01128)
52. Crans (01129)
53. Crottet (01134)
54. Cruzilles-lès-Mépillat (01136)
55. Curciat-Dongalon (01139)
56. Curtafond (01140)
57. Dagneux (01142)
58. Dompierre-sur-Chalaronne (01146)
59. Dompierre-sur-Veyle (01145)
60. Domsure (01147)
61. Drom (01150)
62. Druillat (01151)
63. Fareins (01157)
64. Feillens (01159)
65. Foissiat (01163)
66. Francheleins (01165)
67. Frans (01166)
68. Garnerans (01167)
69. Genouilleux (01169)
70. Gorrevod (01175)
71. Grand-Corent (01177)
72. Grièges (01179)
73. Guéreins (01183)
74. Hautecourt-Romanèche (01184)
75. Illiat (01188)
76. Jassans-Riottier (01194)
77. Jasseron (01195)
78. Jayat (01196)
79. Journans (01197)
80. Laiz (01203)
81. Lapeyrouse (01207)
82. Lent (01211)
83. Lescheroux (01212)
84. Lurcy (01225)
85. Malafretaz (01229)
86. Mantenay-Montlin (01230)
87. Manziat (01231)
88. Marboz (01232)
89. Marlieux (01235)
90. Marsonnas (01236)
91. Massieux (01238)
92. Meillonnas (01241)
93. Messimy-sur-Saône (01243)
94. Mézériat (01246)
95. Mionnay (01248)
96. Miribel (01249)
97. Misérieux (01250)
98. Mogneneins (01252)
99. Montagnat (01254)
100. Montceaux (01258)
101. Montcet (01259)
102. Monthieux (01261)
103. Montluel (01262)
104. Montmerle-sur-Saône (01263)
105. Montracol (01264)
106. Montrevel-en-Bresse (01266)
107. Neuville-les-Dames (01272)
108. Neyron (01275)
109. Niévroz (01276)
110. Nivigne et Suran (01095)
111. Ozan (01284)
112. Parcieux (01285)
113. Péronnas (01289)
114. Perrex (01291)
115. Peyzieux-sur-Saône (01295)
116. Pirajoux (01296)
117. Pizay (01297)
118. Le Plantay (01299)
119. Polliat (01301)
120. Pont-de-Vaux (01305)
121. Pont-de-Veyle (01306)
122. Pouillat (01309)
123. Ramasse (01317)
124. Rancé (01318)
125. Relevant (01319)
126. Replonges (01320)
127. Revonnas (01321)
128. Reyrieux (01322)
129. Reyssouze (01323)
130. Romans (01328)
131. Saint-André-de-Bâgé (01332)
132. Saint-André-de-Corcy (01333)
133. Saint-André-d'Huiriat (01334)
134. Saint-André-le-Bouchoux (01335)
135. Saint-André-sur-Vieux-Jonc (01336)
136. Saint-Bénigne (01337)
137. Saint-Bernard (01339)
138. Saint-Cyr-sur-Menthon (01343)
139. Saint-Denis-lès-Bourg (01344)
140. Saint-Didier-d'Aussiat (01346)
141. Saint-Didier-de-Formans (01347)
142. Saint-Didier-sur-Chalaronne (01348)
143. Sainte-Croix (01342)
144. Sainte-Euphémie (01353)
145. Sainte-Olive (01382)
146. Saint-Étienne-du-Bois (01350)
147. Saint-Étienne-sur-Chalaronne (01351)
148. Saint-Étienne-sur-Reyssouze (01352)
149. Saint-Genis-sur-Menthon (01355)
150. Saint-Georges-sur-Renon (01356)
151. Saint-Germain-sur-Renon (01359)
152. Saint-Jean-de-Thurigneux (01362)
153. Saint-Jean-sur-Reyssouze (01364)
154. Saint-Jean-sur-Veyle (01365)
155. Saint-Julien-sur-Reyssouze (01367)
156. Saint-Julien-sur-Veyle (01368)
157. Saint-Just (01369)
158. Saint-Laurent-sur-Saône (01370)
159. Saint-Marcel (01371)
160. Saint-Martin-du-Mont (01374)
161. Saint-Martin-le-Châtel (01375)
162. Saint-Maurice-de-Beynost (01376)
163. Saint-Nizier-le-Bouchoux (01380)
164. Saint-Nizier-le-Désert (01381)
165. Saint-Paul-de-Varax (01383)
166. Saint-Rémy (01385)
167. Saint-Sulpice (01387)
168. Saint-Trivier-de-Courtes (01388)
169. Saint-Trivier-sur-Moignans (01389)
170. Salavre (01391)
171. Sandrans (01393)
172. Savigneux (01398)
173. Sermoyer (01402)
174. Servas (01405)
175. Servignat (01406)
176. Simandre-sur-Suran (01408)
177. Sulignat (01412)
178. Thil (01418)
179. Thoissey (01420)
180. Tossiat (01422)
181. Toussieux (01423)
182. Tramoyes (01424)
183. La Tranclière (01425)
184. Trévoux (01427)
185. Valeins (01428)
186. Val-Revermont (01426)
187. Vandeins (01429)
188. Verjon (01432)
189. Vernoux (01433)
190. Versailleux (01434)
191. Vescours (01437)
192. Vésines (01439)
193. Villars-les-Dombes (01443)
194. Villemotier (01445)
195. Villeneuve (01446)
196. Villereversure (01447)
197. Villette-sur-Ain (01449)
198. Viriat (01451)
199. Vonnas (01457)

== History ==
The arrondissement of Bourg-en-Bresse was created in 1800. At the January 2017 reorganization of the arrondissements of Ain, it lost 12 communes to the arrondissement of Belley and four to the arrondissement of Nantua.

As a result of the reorganisation of the cantons of France which came into effect in 2015, the borders of the cantons are no longer related to the borders of the arrondissements. The cantons of the arrondissement of Bourg-en-Bresse were, as of January 2015:

1. Bâgé-le-Châtel
2. Bourg-en-Bresse-Est
3. Bourg-en-Bresse-Nord-Centre
4. Bourg-en-Bresse-Sud
5. Ceyzériat
6. Chalamont
7. Châtillon-sur-Chalaronne
8. Coligny
9. Meximieux
10. Miribel
11. Montluel
12. Montrevel-en-Bresse
13. Péronnas
14. Pont-d'Ain
15. Pont-de-Vaux
16. Pont-de-Veyle
17. Reyrieux
18. Saint-Trivier-de-Courtes
19. Saint-Trivier-sur-Moignans
20. Thoissey
21. Treffort-Cuisiat
22. Trévoux
23. Villars-les-Dombes
24. Viriat
