= Jean de La Baume =

15th-century French nobleman

D'or, à la bande
vivrée d'azur.

Jean de La Baume (dead after 25 January 1435) was a Marshal of France from 1422 until his death.

== Functions ==
He was:

- Esquire and ordinary cup-bearer of John the Fearless, Duke of Burgundy (named on 22 December 1404 in Châlon-sur-Saône) and was named Count of Montrevel-en-Bresse.
- Provost et Governor of Paris (1421-1422, see Prévôt de Paris), named by Henry V, King of England Regent of the Kingdom of France
- Marshal of France from 1422, named by Henry V, King of England Regent of the Kingdom of France

== Titles ==
He was:

- Count of Montrevel-en-Bresse and Sinopoli in Calabria
- Lord of Valusin, Montgeffon, Marbos, Poissia et l'Abergement Illia, Saint-Étienne-du-Bois, Saint-Étienne-sur-Reyssouze, Mont Saint-Sorlin, Esnes-Asnières, Montfort, Irlains, Aigremont, Ormont, Marigny, Esté, Bussy, La Roche-du-Vanel, Montribloud, Coppet, Mats, Sernage et Attalens.

== Honours ==
- Kingdom of France - Duchy of Orléans : Knight of the Order of the Porcupine on 17 March 1404 by Louis I, Duke of Orléans.
- Duchy of Savoy : Knight of the Order of the Collar of Savoy.
