= Canton of Bâgé-le-Châtel =

Former canton in France

Coordinates: 46°18′31″N 4°55′49″E

Bâgé-le-Châtel
- Former canton
- Interactive map of Bâgé-le-Châtel
- Country: France
- Region: Auvergne-Rhône-Alpes
- Department: Ain
- No. of communes: {{{nbcomm}}}
- Disbanded: 2015
- Area: 113.68 km^{2} (43.89 sq mi)
- Population (2012): 16,187
  - Density: 142.39/km^{2} (368.79/sq mi)

The canton of Bâgé-le-Châtel is a former administrative division in eastern France. It was disbanded following the French canton reorganisation which came into effect in March 2015. It had 16,187 inhabitants (2012).

The canton comprised 10 communes:

- Asnières-sur-Saône
- Bâgé-la-Ville
- Bâgé-le-Châtel
- Dommartin
- Feillens
- Manziat
- Replonges
- Saint-André-de-Bâgé
- Saint-Laurent-sur-Saône
- Vésines

== Demographics ==
Historical population Canton of Bâgé-le-Châtel
Year	1962	1968	1975	1982	1990	1999
Pop.	10,173	10,921	11,162	11,853	12,363	13,396
±%	—	+7.4%	+2.2%	+6.2%	+4.3%	+8.4%
From the year 1962 on: No double counting – residents of multiple communes (e.g. students and military personnel) are counted only once. Source: INSEE

== See also ==
- Cantons of the Ain department
- Communes of France
