= Bage =

Bage may refer to:

== Asia Minor ==
- Bage (Lydia), a town of ancient Lydia

== Brazil ==
- Bagé, a city in Rio Grande do Sul, Brazil
  - Grêmio Esportivo Bagé, usually known simply as Bagé, a football team in Bagé, Rio Grande do Sul
- Bagé River, in state of Acre, Brazil

== France ==
- Canton of Bâgé-le-Châtel, in the department of Ain that includes
  - Bâgé-la-Ville, a commune
  - Bâgé-le-Châtel, a commune
  - Saint-André-de-Bâgé, a commune
- Lac de Bage, in the department of Aveyron

== People ==
- Charles Bage (1751–1822), designer of the first ever iron framed building
- Edward Frederick Robert Bage (1888–1915), engineer in the Royal Australian Engineers and polar explorer
- Robert Bage (1728–1801), English novelist

== See also ==
- Bages (disambiguation)
