= Jacques-Pierre-Louis Puthod =

Jacques-Pierre-Louis-Marie-Joseph Puthod
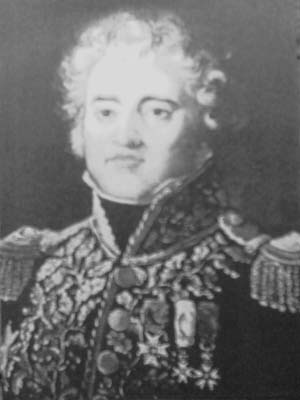
- Born: 28 September 1769; Bâgé-le-Châtel, France
- Died: 31 March 1837 (aged 67); Libourne, France
- Military career
- Allegiance: Kingdom of France, Kingdom of France (1791-1792), French First Republic, First French Empire, Bourbon Restoration
- Branch: Infantry
- Service years: 1785-1815
- Rank: General of Division
- Conflicts: French Revolutionary Wars; Napoleonic Wars
- Awards: Baron of the Empire, Viscount

Jacques-Pierre-Louis-Marie-Joseph, vicomte Puthod, Viscount (French pronunciation: [ʒak pjɛʁ lwi maʁi ʒozɛf pyto]; 28 September 1769 in Bâgé-le-Châtel – 31 March 1837 in Libourne) was a French soldier of the French Revolutionary Wars who rose to the rank of General and who subsequently took part to the Napoleonic Wars, rising to the top military rank of General of Division.

== Revolutionary Wars ==
Puthod enlisted as a volunteer in the Couronne-Infanterie regiment in 1785, during the Ancien Régime, rising to rank of Sub-Lieutenant in the Gendarmes-Dauphin company two years later. He then fought in the defense of Lille in 1792, before being sent to serve in the "Army of the Rhine". While serving in the "Army of Italy", he knew sudden advancement when General Jacques MacDonald named him Brigadier General on 17 July 1799. Puthod later distinguished himself at the passage of the Danube and at the Battle of Höchstädt.

== Napoleonic Wars and beyond ==
It took seven years before Puthod was given his next significant command, which came in 1807, when he was named at the helm of a Baden brigade. In 1808, with the outbreak of the Peninsular War, Puthod was sent to Spain, where he led his troops very well at the battle of Espinosa, becoming a General of Division before the end of that year. Called to serve in the War of the Fifth Coalition against Austria, Puthod was noted for his behaviour at the battle of Wagram and was subsequently assigned to the command of military divisions throughout France. A Baron of the Empire in 1810, he was recalled to active service in 1813 for the War of the Sixth Coalition, serving with distinction at battles such as Möckern, Bautzen or Katzbach, after which he was taken prisoner on 29 August. Following Napoleon's abdication, Puthod enjoyed the favours of the Bourbon Restoration, with Louis XVIII creating him a Viscount of France.

The name PUTHOD is one of the names inscribed under the Arc de Triomphe in Paris.

== Sources ==
- Fierro, Alfredo; Palluel-Guillard, André; Tulard, Jean - "Histoire et Dictionnaire du Consulat et de l'Empire”, Éditions Robert Laffont, ISBN 2-221-05858-5
