= Chevroux =

Chevroux may refer to:

- Chevroux, Ain, a commune of the Ain department, France
- Chevroux, Switzerland, a municipality of the Canton of Vaud
