= Saint-Jean-sur-Reyssouze =

Commune in Auvergne-Rhône-Alpes, France

- Commune
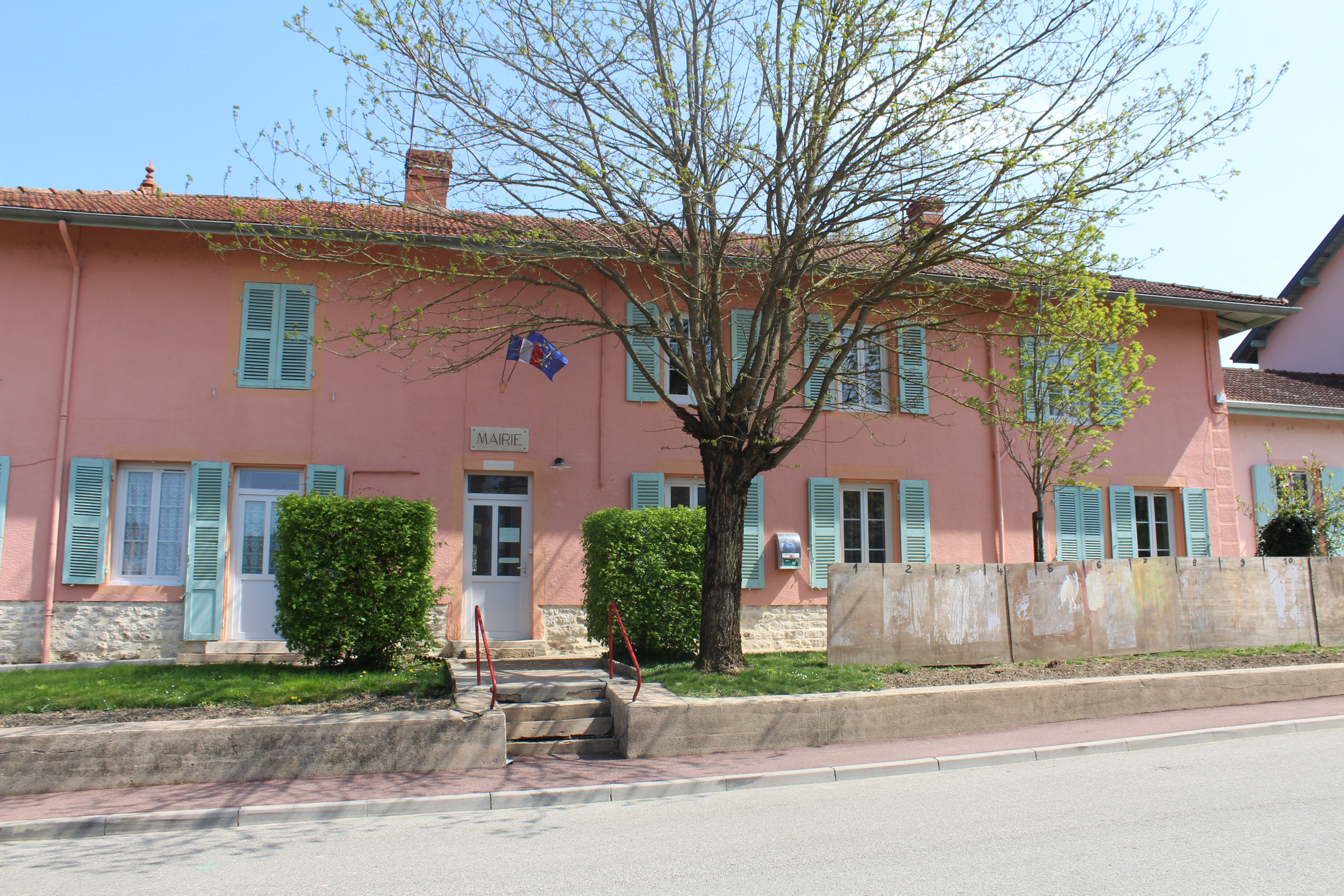
- Town hall
- Location of Saint-Jean-sur-Reyssouze
- Location within France Location within Auvergne-Rhône-Alpes
- Coordinates: 46°23′49″N 5°03′48″E
- Country: France
- Region: Auvergne-Rhône-Alpes
- Department: Ain
- Arrondissement: Bourg-en-Bresse
- Canton: Replonges
- Intercommunality: CA Bassin de Bourg-en-Bresse

Government
  - Mayor (2026–32): Sandrine Courtois
- Area^{1}: 27.48 km^{2} (10.61 sq mi)
- Elevation: 192 m (630 ft)
- Highest elevation: 218 m (715 ft)
- Lowest elevation: 178 m (584 ft)
- Population (2023): 762
  - Density: 27.7/km^{2} (71.8/sq mi)
- Time zone: UTC+01:00 (CET)
  - Summer (DST): UTC+02:00 (CEST)
- INSEE/Postal code: 01364 /01560
- ^{1} French Land Register data, which excludes lakes, ponds, glaciers > 1 km^{2} (0.386 sq mi or 247 acres) and river estuaries.

Saint-Jean-sur-Reyssouze (French pronunciation: [sɛ̃ ʒɑ̃ syʁ ʁɛsuz], literally Saint-Jean on Reyssouze) is a commune in the Ain department in eastern France.

== Population ==
Historical population
Year	Pop.	±% p.a.
1968	818	—
1975	680	−2.61%
1982	578	−2.29%
1990	541	−0.82%
1999	579	+0.76%
2007	699	+2.38%
2012	735	+1.01%
2017	744	+0.24%
2023	762	+0.40%
Source: INSEE

== See also ==
- Communes of the Ain department
