= Saint-Étienne-sur-Reyssouze =

Commune in Auvergne-Rhône-Alpes, France

- Commune
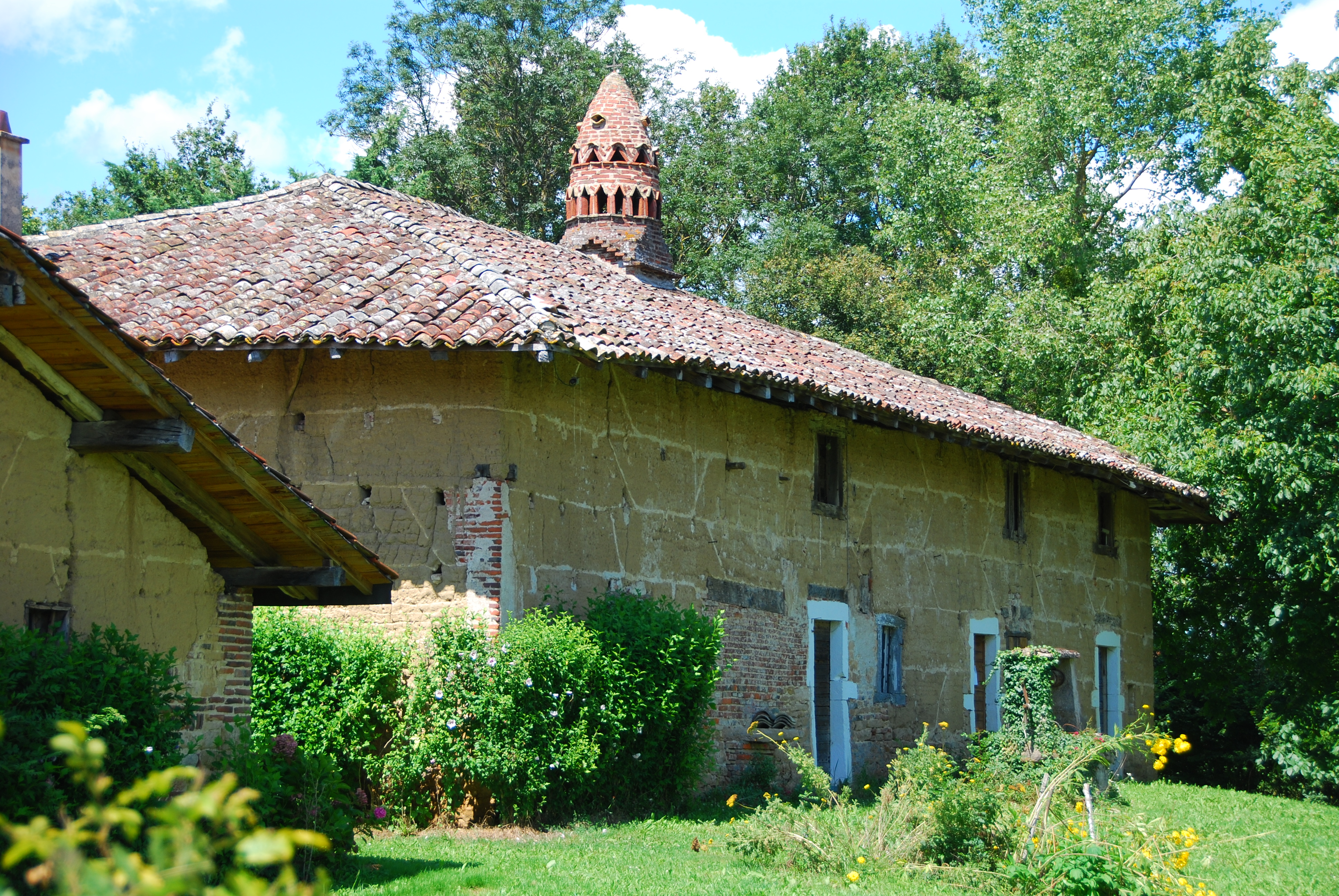
- Pérignat farm
- Location of Saint-Étienne-sur-Reyssouze
- Location within France Location within Auvergne-Rhône-Alpes
- Coordinates: 46°24′50″N 5°00′06″E
- Country: France
- Region: Auvergne-Rhône-Alpes
- Department: Ain
- Arrondissement: Bourg-en-Bresse
- Canton: Replonges
- Intercommunality: Bresse et Saône

Government
  - Mayor (2026–32): Daniel Jacquet
- Area^{1}: 13.82 km^{2} (5.34 sq mi)
- Elevation: 185 m (607 ft)
- Highest elevation: 209 m (686 ft)
- Lowest elevation: 175 m (574 ft)
- Population (2023): 572
  - Density: 41.4/km^{2} (107/sq mi)
- Time zone: UTC+01:00 (CET)
  - Summer (DST): UTC+02:00 (CEST)
- INSEE/Postal code: 01352 /01190
- ^{1} French Land Register data, which excludes lakes, ponds, glaciers > 1 km^{2} (0.386 sq mi or 247 acres) and river estuaries.

Saint-Étienne-sur-Reyssouze (French pronunciation: [sɛ̃.t‿etjɛn syʁ ʁɛsuz], literally Saint-Étienne on Reyssouze) is a commune in the Ain department in eastern France. It is part of the Bresse region.

== Population ==
Historical population
Year	Pop.	±% p.a.
1968	480	—
1975	409	−2.26%
1982	402	−0.25%
1990	376	−0.83%
1999	386	+0.29%
2007	510	+3.54%
2012	550	+1.52%
2017	571	+0.75%
2023	572	+0.03%
Source: INSEE

== See also ==
- Communes of the Ain department
