= Bages (disambiguation) =

Bages is a comarca (county) in Catalonia, Spain.

Bages may also refer to:

- Bages, Aude, a commune of the Aude département in France
- Bages, Pyrénées-Orientales, a commune of the Pyrénées-Orientales département in France

== See also ==
- Bage (disambiguation)
