= Chavannes-sur-Reyssouze =

Commune in Auvergne-Rhône-Alpes, France

- Commune
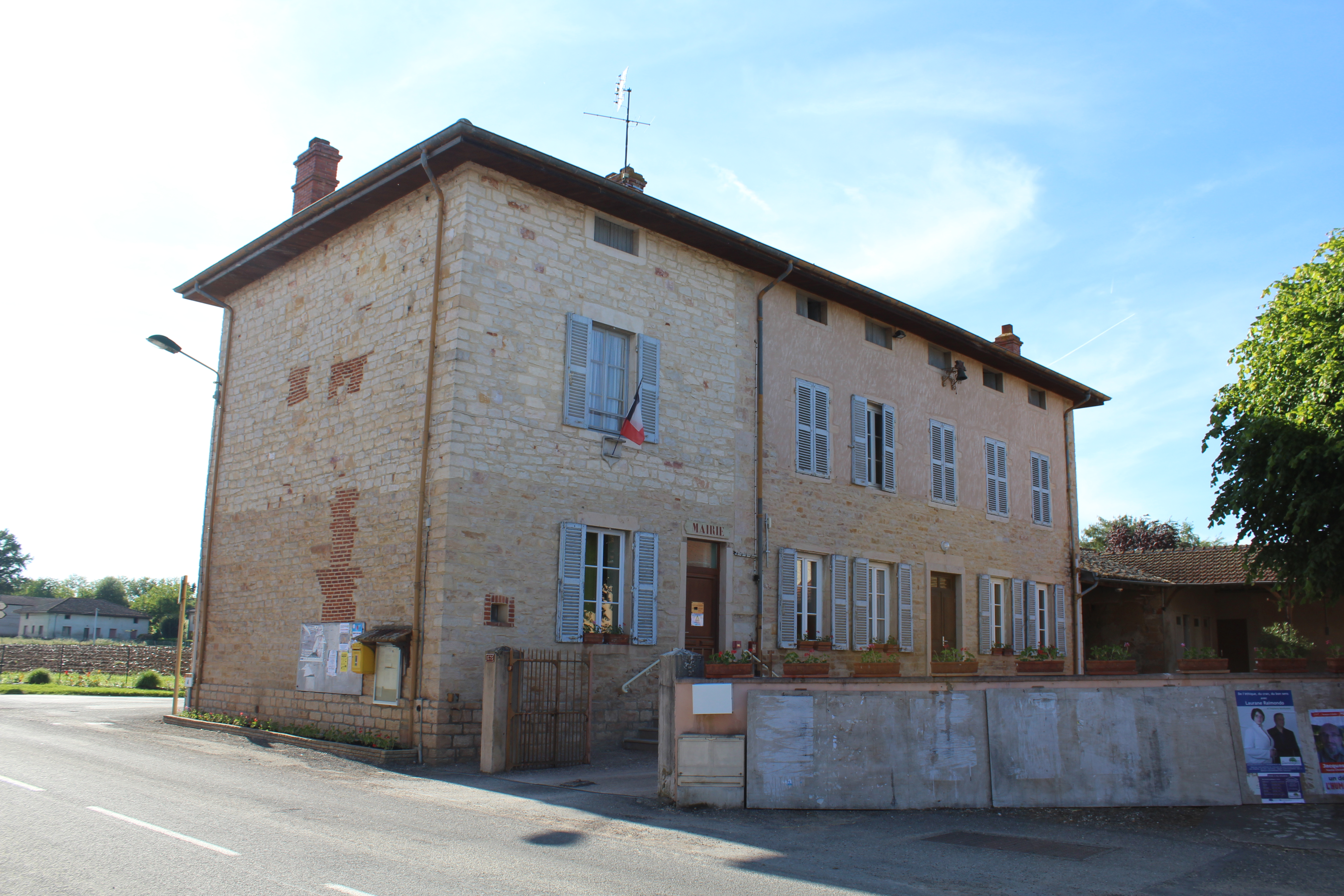
- Town hall
- Location of Chavannes-sur-Reyssouze
- Location within France Location within Auvergne-Rhône-Alpes
- Coordinates: 46°25′54″N 4°59′38″E
- Country: France
- Region: Auvergne-Rhône-Alpes
- Department: Ain
- Arrondissement: Bourg-en-Bresse
- Canton: Replonges
- Intercommunality: Bresse et Saône

Government
  - Mayor (2026–32): Dominique Douard
- Area^{1}: 16.55 km^{2} (6.39 sq mi)
- Elevation: 170 m (560 ft)
- Highest elevation: 218 m (715 ft)
- Lowest elevation: 175 m (574 ft)
- Population (2023): 726
  - Density: 43.9/km^{2} (114/sq mi)
- Time zone: UTC+01:00 (CET)
  - Summer (DST): UTC+02:00 (CEST)
- INSEE/Postal code: 01094 /01190
- ^{1} French Land Register data, which excludes lakes, ponds, glaciers > 1 km^{2} (0.386 sq mi or 247 acres) and river estuaries.

Chavannes-sur-Reyssouze (French pronunciation: [ʃavan syʁ ʁɛsuz], literally Chavannes on Reyssouze) is a commune in the Ain department in eastern France.

== Population ==
Historical population
Year	Pop.	±% p.a.
1968	614	—
1975	573	−0.98%
1982	543	−0.77%
1990	565	+0.50%
1999	580	+0.29%
2007	658	+1.59%
2012	715	+1.68%
2017	753	+1.04%
2023	726	−0.61%
Source: INSEE

== See also ==
- Communes of the Ain department
