= Saint-Julien-sur-Reyssouze =

Commune in Auvergne-Rhône-Alpes, France

- Commune
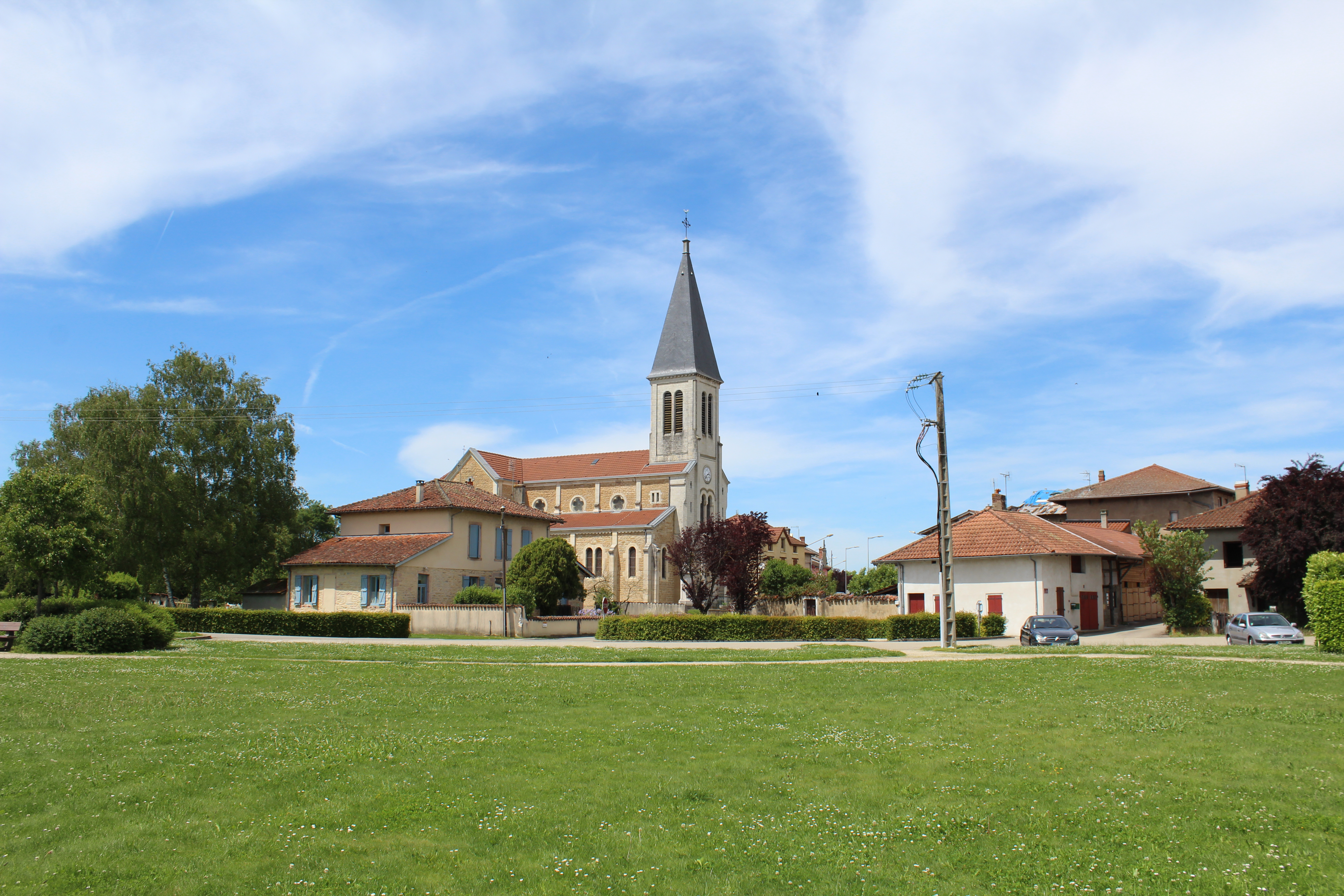
- Location of Saint-Julien-sur-Reyssouze
- Location within France Location within Auvergne-Rhône-Alpes
- Coordinates: 46°24′09″N 5°06′43″E
- Country: France
- Region: Auvergne-Rhône-Alpes
- Department: Ain
- Arrondissement: Bourg-en-Bresse
- Canton: Replonges
- Intercommunality: CA Bassin de Bourg-en-Bresse

Government
  - Mayor (2026–32): Nathalie Ligeron
- Area^{1}: 7.52 km^{2} (2.90 sq mi)
- Elevation: 192 m (630 ft)
- Highest elevation: 218 m (715 ft)
- Lowest elevation: 182 m (597 ft)
- Population (2023): 679
  - Density: 90.3/km^{2} (234/sq mi)
- Time zone: UTC+01:00 (CET)
  - Summer (DST): UTC+02:00 (CEST)
- INSEE/Postal code: 01367 /01560
- ^{1} French Land Register data, which excludes lakes, ponds, glaciers > 1 km^{2} (0.386 sq mi or 247 acres) and river estuaries.

Saint-Julien-sur-Reyssouzè (French pronunciation: [sɛ̃ ʒyljɛ̃ syʁ ʁɛsuz], literally Saint-Julien on Reyssouze) is a commune in the Ain department in eastern France.

== Geography ==
=== Climate ===
Saint-Julien-sur-Reyssouze has an oceanic climate (Köppen climate classification Cfb). The average annual temperature in Saint-Julien-sur-Reyssouze is 11.8 °C (53.2 °F). The average annual rainfall is 1,014.0 mm (39.92 in) with November as the wettest month. The temperatures are highest on average in July, at around 21.0 °C (69.8 °F), and lowest in January, at around 3.0 °C (37.4 °F). The highest temperature ever recorded in Saint-Julien-sur-Reyssouze was 40.4 °C (104.7 °F) on 13 August 2003; the coldest temperature ever recorded was −19.0 °C (−2.2 °F) on 20 December 2009.

Climate data for Saint-Julien-sur-Reyssouze (1981–2010 averages, extremes 1992−present)
Month	Jan	Feb	Mar	Apr	May	Jun	Jul	Aug	Sep	Oct	Nov	Dec	Year
Record high °C (°F)	17.7 (63.9)	21.4 (70.5)	25.8 (78.4)	29.7 (85.5)	34.2 (93.6)	38.2 (100.8)	40.1 (104.2)	40.4 (104.7)	34.6 (94.3)	28.4 (83.1)	22.5 (72.5)	17.6 (63.7)	40.4 (104.7)
Mean daily maximum °C (°F)	6.2 (43.2)	8.4 (47.1)	13.2 (55.8)	16.9 (62.4)	21.7 (71.1)	25.4 (77.7)	27.4 (81.3)	27.0 (80.6)	22.0 (71.6)	17.0 (62.6)	10.4 (50.7)	6.5 (43.7)	16.9 (62.4)
Daily mean °C (°F)	3.0 (37.4)	4.3 (39.7)	7.8 (46.0)	11.1 (52.0)	15.7 (60.3)	19.1 (66.4)	21.0 (69.8)	20.6 (69.1)	16.2 (61.2)	12.4 (54.3)	6.8 (44.2)	3.5 (38.3)	11.8 (53.2)
Mean daily minimum °C (°F)	−0.3 (31.5)	0.2 (32.4)	2.4 (36.3)	5.3 (41.5)	9.8 (49.6)	12.9 (55.2)	14.6 (58.3)	14.1 (57.4)	10.4 (50.7)	7.8 (46.0)	3.2 (37.8)	0.5 (32.9)	6.8 (44.2)
Record low °C (°F)	−14.7 (5.5)	−14.5 (5.9)	−12.0 (10.4)	−6.6 (20.1)	−0.2 (31.6)	4.1 (39.4)	6.5 (43.7)	4.0 (39.2)	−0.2 (31.6)	−7.6 (18.3)	−10.0 (14.0)	−19.0 (−2.2)	−19.0 (−2.2)
Average precipitation mm (inches)	75.9 (2.99)	69.5 (2.74)	64.5 (2.54)	82.2 (3.24)	91.8 (3.61)	75.5 (2.97)	79.7 (3.14)	79.9 (3.15)	89.1 (3.51)	104.4 (4.11)	115.0 (4.53)	86.5 (3.41)	1,014 (39.92)
Average precipitation days (≥ 1.0 mm)	10.8	10.0	9.6	10.5	11.4	9.4	8.8	8.6	8.9	12.1	12.9	12.1	125.1
Source: Meteociel

== Population ==
Historical population
Year	Pop.	±% p.a.
1968	570	—
1975	571	+0.03%
1982	517	−1.41%
1990	532	+0.36%
1999	514	−0.38%
2007	572	+1.35%
2012	735	+5.14%
2017	749	+0.38%
2023	679	−1.62%
Source: INSEE

== See also ==
- Communes of the Ain department
