= Bleu de Bresse =

French blue cheese

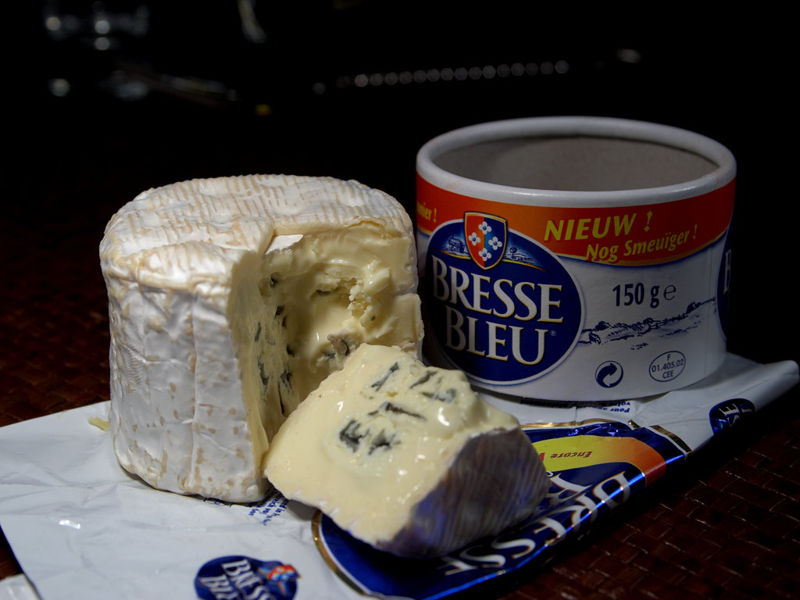
- Country of origin: France
- Region, town: Bresse
- Source of milk: Cow
- Pasteurized: yes
- Texture: creamy
- Aging time: 2-4 weeks
- Certification: no AOC
- Named after: Bresse

Bleu de Bresse (French pronunciation: [blø d(ə) bʁɛs]) is a blue cheese that was first made in the Bresse area of France following World War II. Made from whole milk, it has a firm, edible coating which is characteristically white in colour and has an aroma of mushrooms. Its creamy interior, similar in texture to Brie, contains patches of blue mould. It is shaped into cylindrical rounds weighing from 125 to 500 grams (4.4 to 17.6 oz).

== Production ==
The curds, inoculated with Penicillium roqueforti, are placed into a perforated mould. After it has formed the desired shape and removed from the mould, the cheese is salted, turned, drained, and covered with pulverized Penicillium camemberti to form the outer coating.

== History ==
Bleu de Bresse originated in 1951 by an agricultural cooperative near Servas in response to the growing popularity of Italian cheeses. The small packaged rounds were an innovation for the retail market at the time.

== See also ==
- List of French cheeses
- List of cheeses
