= Vescours =

Commune in Auvergne-Rhône-Alpes, France

- Commune
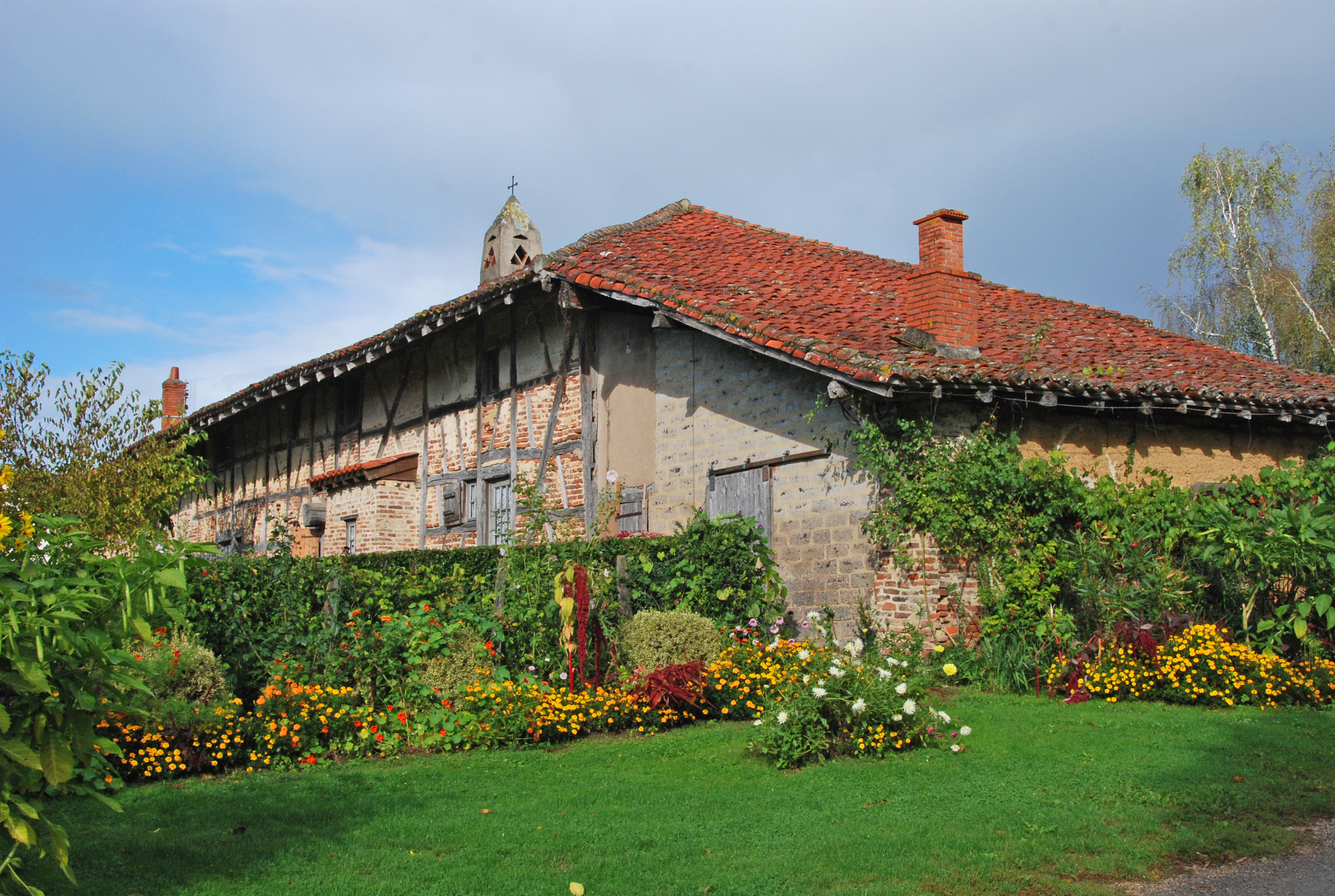
- Montalibord farm
- Location of Vescours
- Location within France Location within Auvergne-Rhône-Alpes
- Coordinates: 46°28′32″N 5°01′32″E
- Country: France
- Region: Auvergne-Rhône-Alpes
- Department: Ain
- Arrondissement: Bourg-en-Bresse
- Canton: Replonges
- Intercommunality: CA Bassin de Bourg-en-Bresse

Government
  - Mayor (2026–32): Isabelle Flamand
- Area^{1}: 12.48 km^{2} (4.82 sq mi)
- Elevation: 212 m (696 ft)
- Highest elevation: 217 m (712 ft)
- Lowest elevation: 184 m (604 ft)
- Population (2023): 221
  - Density: 17.7/km^{2} (45.9/sq mi)
- Time zone: UTC+01:00 (CET)
  - Summer (DST): UTC+02:00 (CEST)
- INSEE/Postal code: 01437 /01560
- ^{1} French Land Register data, which excludes lakes, ponds, glaciers > 1 km^{2} (0.386 sq mi or 247 acres) and river estuaries.

Vescours is a commune in the Ain department in eastern France.

== Population ==
Historical population
Year	Pop.	±% p.a.
1968	225	—
1975	198	−1.81%
1982	181	−1.27%
1990	184	+0.21%
1999	191	+0.42%
2007	199	+0.51%
2012	222	+2.21%
2017	241	+1.66%
2023	221	−1.43%
Source: INSEE

== See also ==
- Communes of the Ain department
