= Bresse =

Former province of France

Coordinates: 46°25′N 05°15′E

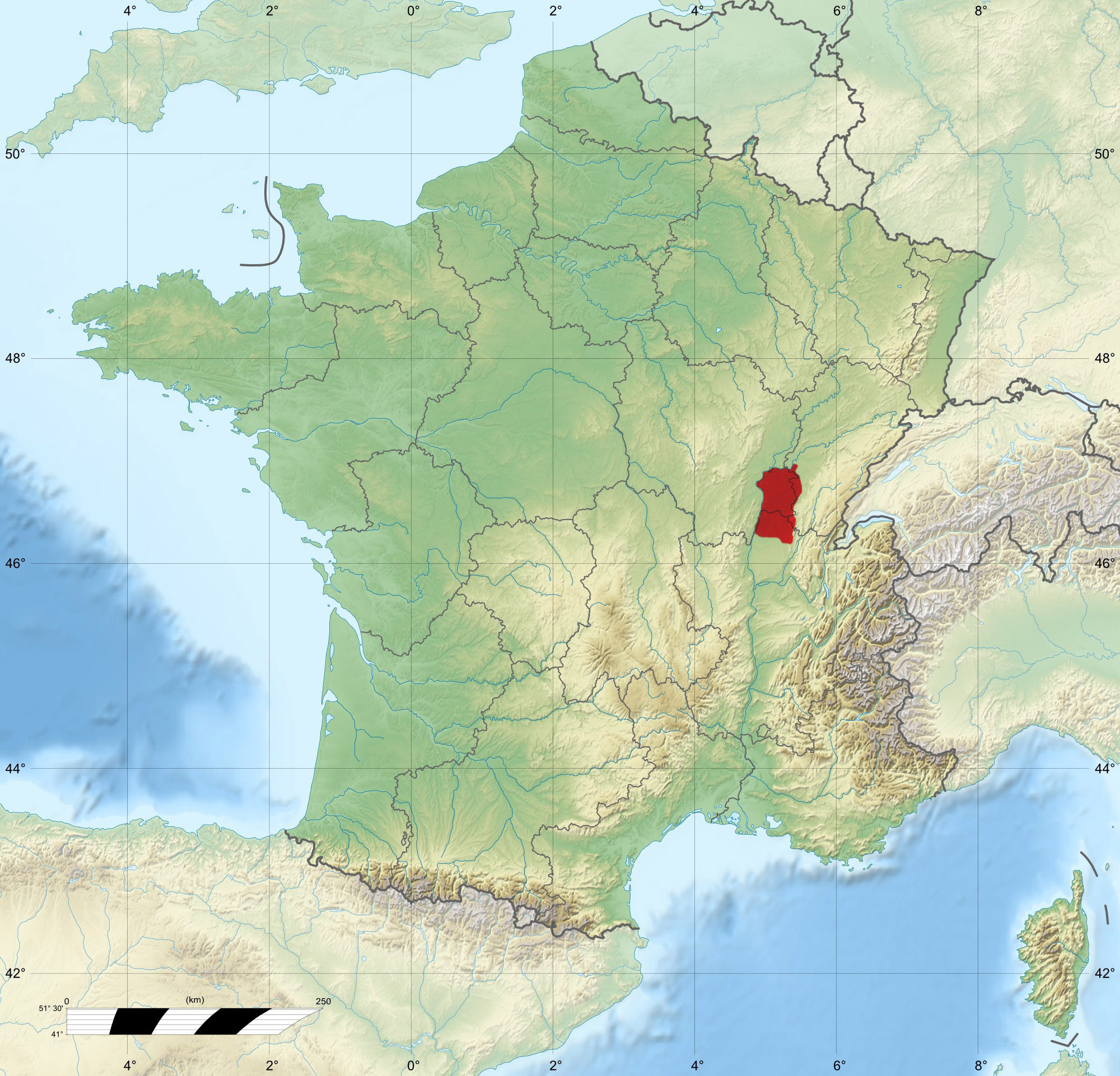
Map of France, with Bresse shaded red

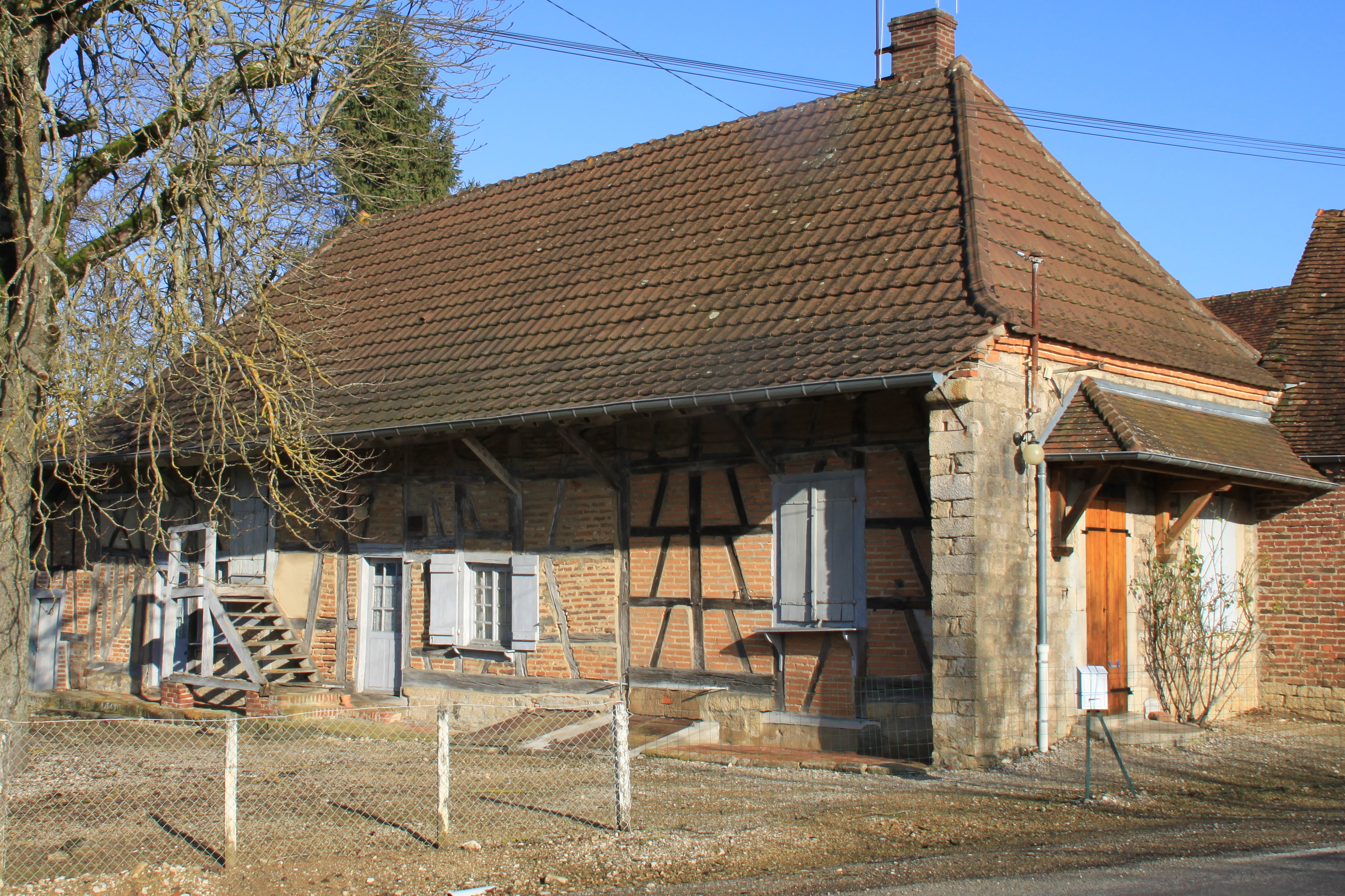
Typical Bresse farm house

Bresse (French pronunciation: [bʁɛs]) is a former French province. It is located in the regions of Auvergne-Rhône-Alpes and Bourgogne-Franche-Comté of eastern France. The geographical term Bresse has two meanings: Bresse bourguignonne (or louhannaise), which is situated in the east of the department of Saône-et-Loire, and Bresse, which is located in the department of Ain. The corresponding adjective is bressan, and the inhabitants are Bressans.

Bresse extends from the Dombes on the south to the river Doubs on the north, and from the Saône eastwards to the Jura Mountains, measuring some 100 kilometres (60 mi) in the former, and 30 kilometres (20 mi) in the latter direction. It is a plain varying from 180–240 metres (600–800 ft) above the sea, with few eminences and a slight inclination westwards. Heaths and coppice alternate with pastures and arable land; pools and marshes are numerous, especially in the north. Its chief rivers are the Veyle, the Reyssouze and the Seille, all tributaries of the Saône. The soil is gravelly clay but moderately fertile, and cattle-raising is largely carried on. The region is, however, more especially celebrated for its table poultry.

== History ==
The region's name derives from the Gallo-Roman name Bricius (Brice).

During the Middle Ages Bresse belonged to the lords of Bâgé, from whom it passed to the House of Savoy in 1272. It was not until the first half of the 15th century that the province, with Bourg as its capital, was founded as such. In 1601 it was ceded to France by the Treaty of Lyon, after which it formed (together with the province of Bugey/Bugê) first a separate government and later part of the government of Burgundy.

Initially, Bâgé was the principal city of the province. But its location, close to the borders of France, encouraged the emergence of Bourg-en-Bresse, which became the capital. The province was coveted by the King of France, who wanted to increase his territory. The flat nature of Bresse was difficult to defend. Finally, the sovereigns of Savoy (Savouè) agreed to relocate to the Alpine part of the Duchy and to give up Bresse and Bugey in exchange for Château-Dauphin in Piedmont.

== Agriculture and economy ==
Bresse is noted for the 1,200,000 chickens per year which are raised primarily outdoors by 330 stockbreeders, with a minimum of 10 square metres per bird. They are sold at an average of 10 euros per kilo. The chickens of Bresse, formerly ranging freely, were the first animals to have an Appellation d'Origine Contrôlée. Bresse chickens are noted as the best quality chicken for cooking.

The Bleu de Bresse cheese originates here.

== Demographics ==
=== Towns in Bresse ===
- Bourg-en-Bresse
- Louhans

== Bressan culture ==
=== Sociological outline ===
A chiefly rural region, Bresse was historically organized around an agricultural economy. The countryside is bocage (woodlands), resulting in independent individuals within the community, organized around the parish and the commune. Social structures, then, are defined by a mixture of conservatism, attachment to ancestral values, and direct democratic participation in community life.

=== Bressan folklore ===
The traditional festival costumes of Bresse are preserved by historical societies. They include, for the women, a wide-brim hat, in the shape of a plate, topped by a black cone. For men, they comprise a blue tunic, a long bonnet, long trousers and shoes.

=== Conscripts ===
The "conscripts' festival" (la fête des conscrits) is a ceremony for young people, 20 years of age. It has its roots in the period of "conscription" founded by General Jourdan in 1798, who required that every man between 20 and 25 years could be called to national service. The people organized festivals before their departure. The ceremonies survive to the present, and are appreciated by the population, seeing them as a way of maintaining social bonds.

These festivals generally take place between January and March. The people gather at a large banquet during which traditional "rigodon" music is played by two musicians, on clarinet and drum. The banquet is entirely organized by 20-year-old people, who make it a point of honour to personally invite each guest to visit their home. They are then given rosettes, in distinctive designs corresponding to their age.

The conscripts' festivals coincide with patron saints' days. Those are the occasions of the vogue, a weekend festival.

=== Dialect ===
Bressan, a dialect of the Franco-Provençal language, was the principal language of informal communication in the Bressan countryside until the 1950s. It is still spoken, though more rarely. (See the article on Franco-Provençal for several examples.)

== Tourism ==
- The church of Brou
- Saracen chimneys
- Bressan farms
