= Mantenay-Montlin =

Commune in Auvergne-Rhône-Alpes, France

- Commune
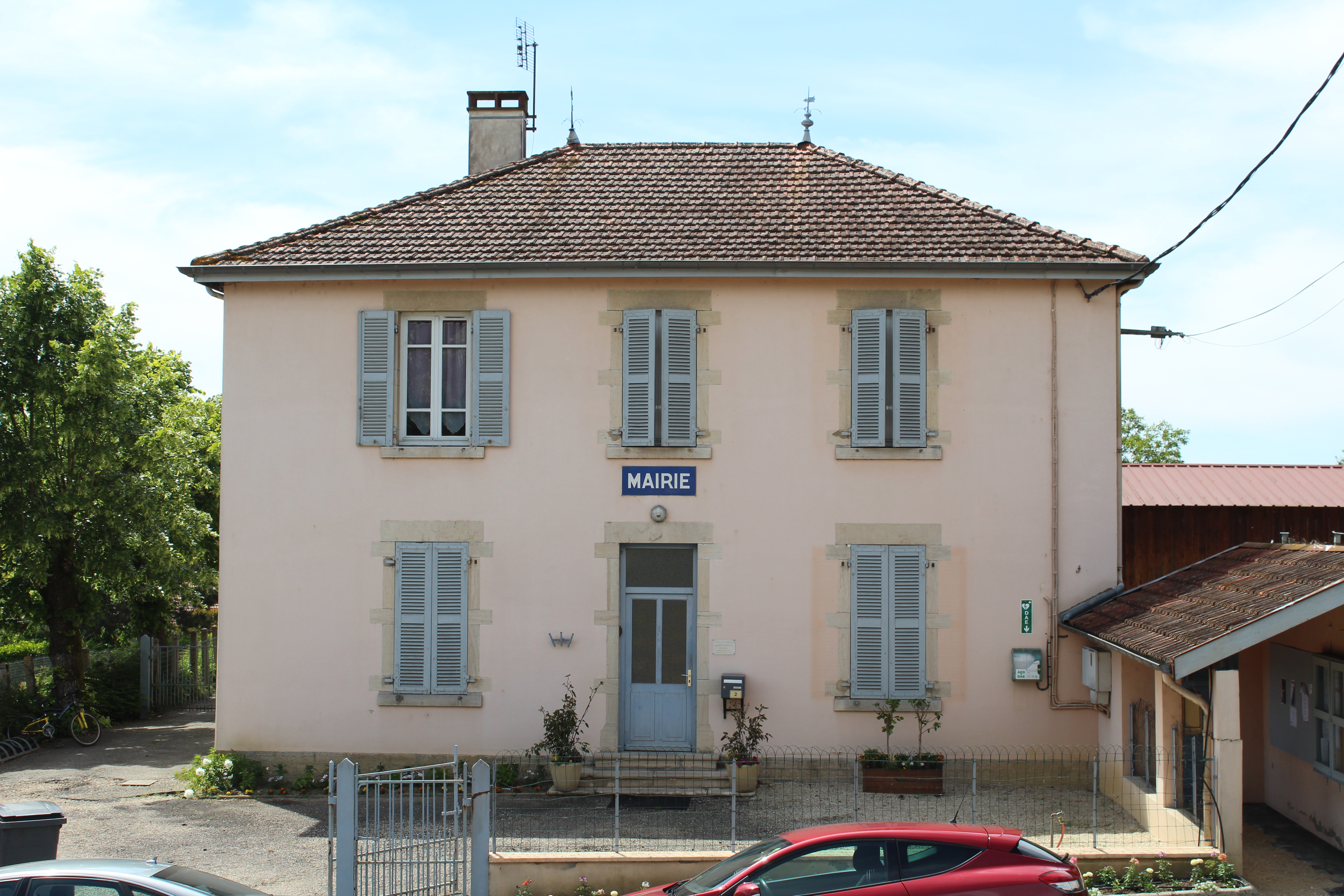
- Town hall
- Location of Mantenay-Montlin
- Location within France Location within Auvergne-Rhône-Alpes
- Coordinates: 46°25′31″N 5°05′56″E
- Country: France
- Region: Auvergne-Rhône-Alpes
- Department: Ain
- Arrondissement: Bourg-en-Bresse
- Canton: Replonges
- Intercommunality: CA Bassin de Bourg-en-Bresse

Government
  - Mayor (2026–32): Celine Fontaine
- Area^{1}: 10.8 km^{2} (4.2 sq mi)
- Elevation: 188 m (617 ft)
- Highest elevation: 222 m (728 ft)
- Lowest elevation: 180 m (590 ft)
- Population (2023): 331
  - Density: 30.6/km^{2} (79.4/sq mi)
- Time zone: UTC+01:00 (CET)
  - Summer (DST): UTC+02:00 (CEST)
- INSEE/Postal code: 01230 /01560
- ^{1} French Land Register data, which excludes lakes, ponds, glaciers > 1 km^{2} (0.386 sq mi or 247 acres) and river estuaries.

Mantenay-Montlin (French pronunciation: [mɑ̃tnɛ mɔ̃lɛ̃]) is a commune in the Ain department in eastern France.

== Population ==
Historical population
Year	Pop.	±% p.a.
1968	319	—
1975	270	−2.35%
1982	252	−0.98%
1990	256	+0.20%
1999	246	−0.44%
2007	281	+1.68%
2012	302	+1.45%
2017	313	+0.72%
2023	331	+0.94%
Source: INSEE

== See also ==
- Communes of the Ain department
