= Replonges =

Commune in Auvergne-Rhône-Alpes, France

- Commune
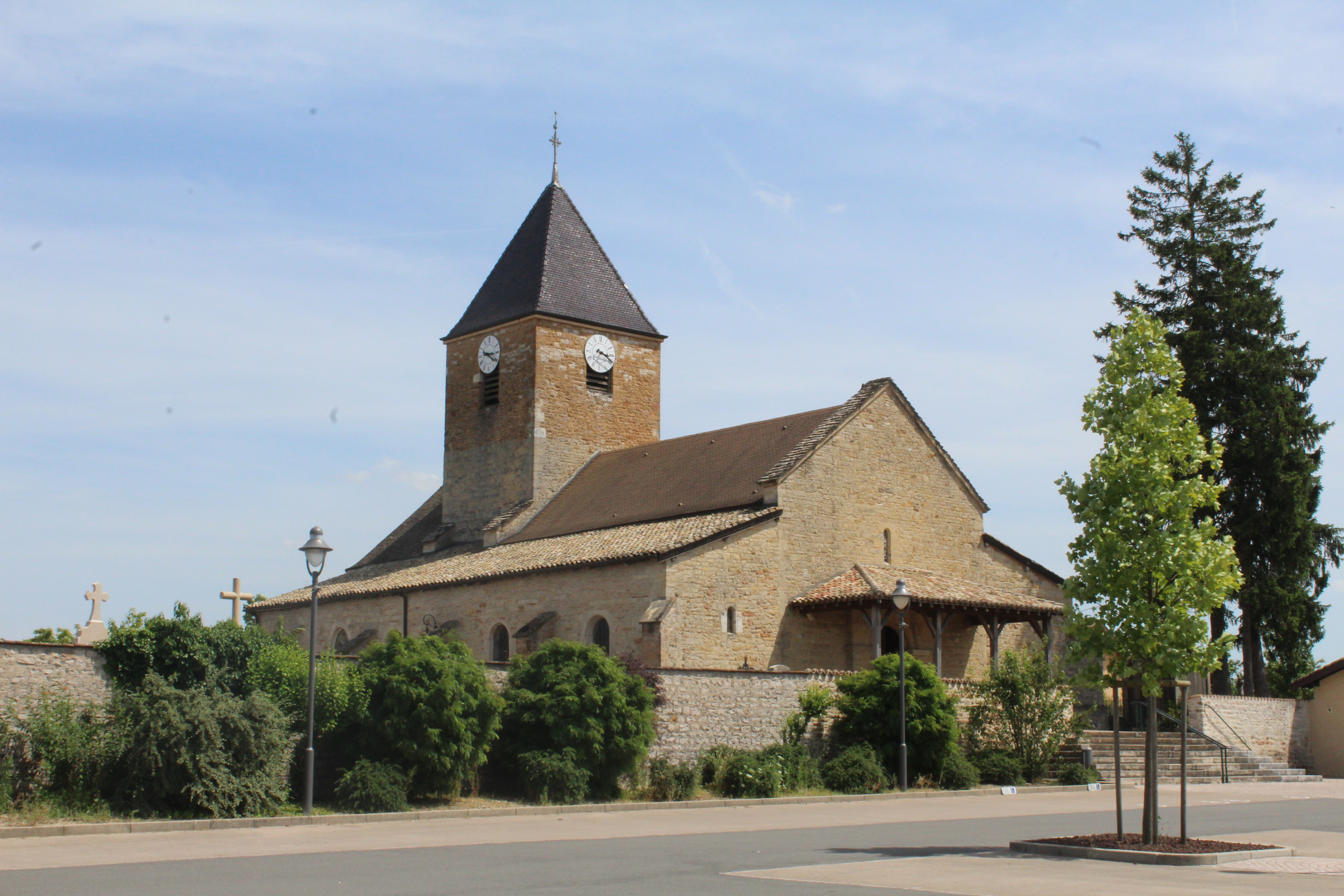

- Coat of arms
- Location of Replonges
- Location within France Location within Auvergne-Rhône-Alpes
- Coordinates: 46°18′04″N 4°52′11″E
- Country: France
- Region: Auvergne-Rhône-Alpes
- Department: Ain
- Arrondissement: Bourg-en-Bresse
- Canton: Replonges
- Intercommunality: Bresse et Saône

Government
  - Mayor (2026–32): Bertrand Vernoux
- Area^{1}: 16.59 km^{2} (6.41 sq mi)
- Elevation: 186 m (610 ft)
- Highest elevation: 270 m (890 ft)
- Lowest elevation: 169 m (554 ft)
- Population (2023): 3,956
  - Density: 238.5/km^{2} (617.6/sq mi)
- Time zone: UTC+01:00 (CET)
  - Summer (DST): UTC+02:00 (CEST)
- INSEE/Postal code: 01320 /01750
- ^{1} French Land Register data, which excludes lakes, ponds, glaciers > 1 km^{2} (0.386 sq mi or 247 acres) and river estuaries.

Replonges (French pronunciation: [ʁəplɔ̃ʒ]) is a commune in the Ain department in eastern France.

== Population ==
Historical population

Year	Pop.	±% p.a.
1793	1,190	—
1800	1,360	+1.93%
1806	1,414	+0.65%
1821	1,635	+0.97%
1831	1,794	+0.93%
1836	1,848	+0.59%
1841	1,874	+0.28%
1846	1,966	+0.96%
1851	2,010	+0.44%
1856	2,039	+0.29%
1861	1,918	−1.22%
1866	1,927	+0.09%
1872	1,872	−0.48%
1876	1,878	+0.08%
1881	1,792	−0.93%
1886	1,687	−1.20%
1891	1,642	−0.54%
1896	1,603	−0.48%
1901	1,620	+0.21%

Year	Pop.	±% p.a.
1906	1,612	−0.10%
1911	1,588	−0.30%
1921	1,540	−0.31%
1926	1,547	+0.09%
1931	1,531	−0.21%
1936	1,590	+0.76%
1946	1,730	+0.85%
1954	1,775	+0.32%
1962	1,873	+0.67%
1968	2,187	+2.62%
1975	2,440	+1.58%
1982	2,610	+0.97%
1990	2,687	+0.36%
1999	2,845	+0.64%
2007	3,167	+1.35%
2012	3,644	+2.85%
2017	3,717	+0.40%
2023	3,956	+1.04%

Source: EHESS and INSEE (1968-2023)

== See also ==
- Communes of the Ain department
