= Boissey, Ain =

Commune in Auvergne-Rhône-Alpes, France

Boissey
- Commune
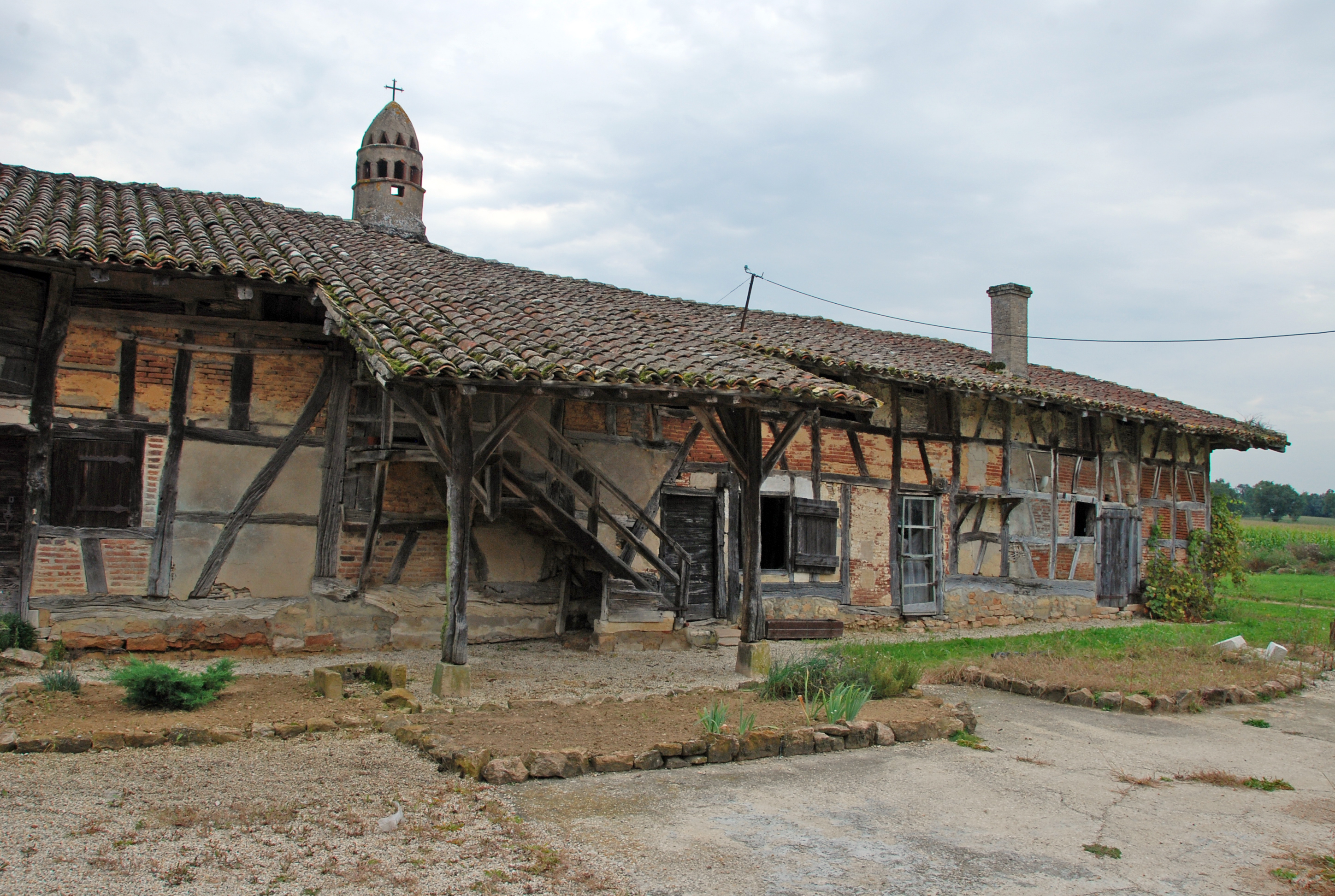
- Layat farm
- Location of Boissey
- Location within France Location within Auvergne-Rhône-Alpes
- Coordinates: 46°22′57″N 4°59′48″E
- Country: France
- Region: Auvergne-Rhône-Alpes
- Department: Ain
- Arrondissement: Bourg-en-Bresse
- Canton: Replonges
- Intercommunality: Bresse et Saône

Government
  - Mayor (2026–32): Mélanie Gaché
- Area^{1}: 9.05 km^{2} (3.49 sq mi)
- Elevation: 200 m (660 ft)
- Highest elevation: 208 m (682 ft)
- Lowest elevation: 182 m (597 ft)
- Population (2023): 396
  - Density: 43.8/km^{2} (113/sq mi)
- Time zone: UTC+01:00 (CET)
  - Summer (DST): UTC+02:00 (CEST)
- INSEE/Postal code: 01050 /01190
- ^{1} French Land Register data, which excludes lakes, ponds, glaciers > 1 km^{2} (0.386 sq mi or 247 acres) and river estuaries.

Boissey (French pronunciation: [bwasɛ]) is a commune in the Ain department in eastern France.

== Population ==
Historical population
Year	Pop.	±% p.a.
1968	238	—
1975	219	−1.18%
1982	207	−0.80%
1990	206	−0.06%
1999	202	−0.22%
2007	225	+1.36%
2012	300	+5.92%
2017	336	+2.29%
2023	396	+2.78%
Source: INSEE

== See also ==
- Communes of the Ain department
