= Canton of Replonges =

Canton in Auvergne-Rhône-Alpes, France

Coordinates: 46.31°N 4.89°E

- Canton
- Situation of the canton of Replonges in the department of Ain
- Country: France
- Region: Auvergne-Rhône-Alpes
- Department: Ain
- No. of communes: {{{nbcomm}}}
- Population (2023): 31,517
- INSEE code: 0117

The canton of Replonges is an administrative division of the Ain department, in eastern France. It was created at the French canton reorganisation which came into effect in March 2015. Its seat is in Replonges.

It consists of the following communes:

1. Arbigny
2. Asnières-sur-Saône
3. Bâgé-Dommartin
4. Bâgé-le-Châtel
5. Boissey
6. Boz
7. Chavannes-sur-Reyssouze
8. Chevroux
9. Courtes
10. Curciat-Dongalon
11. Feillens
12. Gorrevod
13. Lescheroux
14. Mantenay-Montlin
15. Manziat
16. Ozan
17. Pont-de-Vaux
18. Replonges
19. Reyssouze
20. Saint-André-de-Bâgé
21. Saint-Bénigne
22. Saint-Étienne-sur-Reyssouze
23. Saint-Jean-sur-Reyssouze
24. Saint-Julien-sur-Reyssouze
25. Saint-Nizier-le-Bouchoux
26. Saint-Trivier-de-Courtes
27. Sermoyer
28. Servignat
29. Vernoux
30. Vescours
31. Vésines
