= Gorrevod =

Commune in Auvergne-Rhône-Alpes, France

- Commune
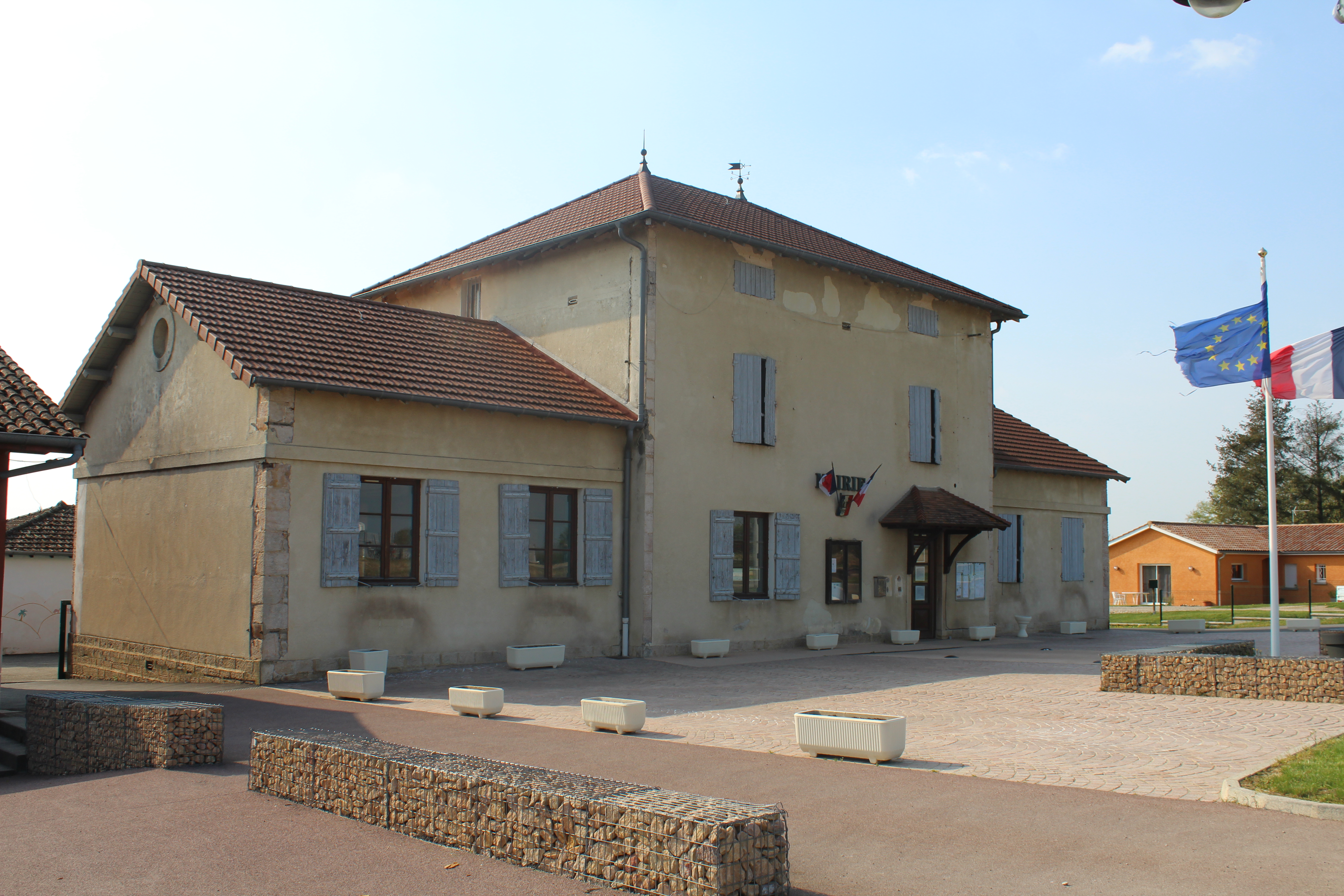
- Town hall

- Coat of arms
- Location of Gorrevod
- Location within France Location within Auvergne-Rhône-Alpes
- Coordinates: 46°25′00″N 4°56′31″E
- Country: France
- Region: Auvergne-Rhône-Alpes
- Department: Ain
- Arrondissement: Bourg-en-Bresse
- Canton: Replonges

Government
  - Mayor (2026–32): Bernard Badet
- Area^{1}: 6.88 km^{2} (2.66 sq mi)
- Elevation: 236 m (774 ft)
- Highest elevation: 204 m (669 ft)
- Lowest elevation: 172 m (564 ft)
- Population (2023): 815
  - Density: 118/km^{2} (307/sq mi)
- Time zone: UTC+01:00 (CET)
  - Summer (DST): UTC+02:00 (CEST)
- INSEE/Postal code: 01175 /01190
- ^{1} French Land Register data, which excludes lakes, ponds, glaciers > 1 km^{2} (0.386 sq mi or 247 acres) and river estuaries.

Gorrevod (French pronunciation: [ɡɔʁvo]; Arpitan: Gorrevôd) is a commune in the Ain department in eastern France.

== Population ==
Historical population
Year	Pop.	±% p.a.
1968	356	—
1975	400	+1.68%
1982	441	+1.40%
1990	512	+1.88%
1999	561	+1.02%
2007	692	+2.66%
2012	816	+3.35%
2017	835	+0.46%
2023	815	−0.40%
Source: INSEE

== See also ==
- Communes of the Ain department
