= Servignat =

Commune in Auvergne-Rhône-Alpes, France

- Commune
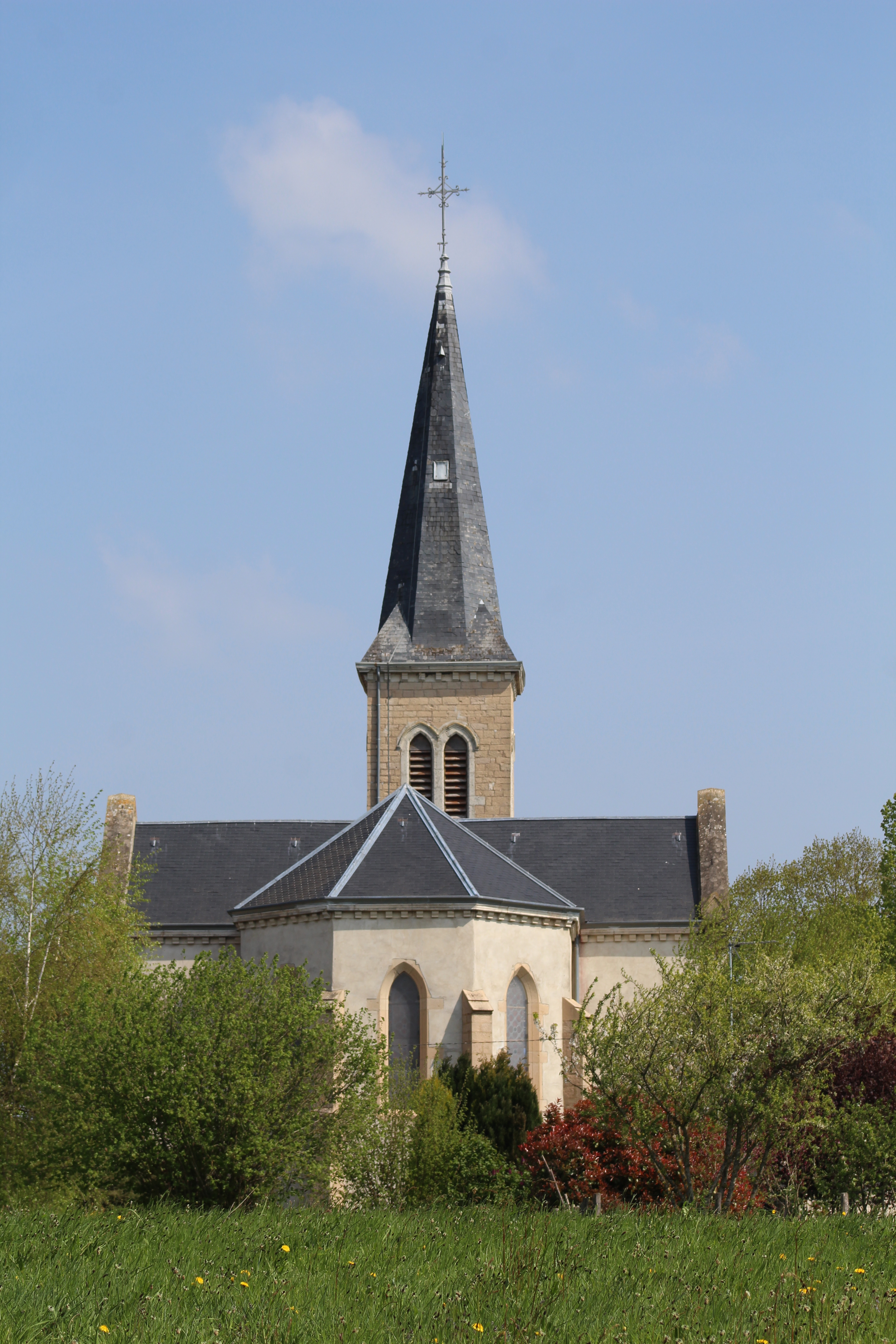
- Location of Servignat
- Location within France Location within Auvergne-Rhône-Alpes
- Coordinates: 46°26′03″N 5°04′12″E
- Country: France
- Region: Auvergne-Rhône-Alpes
- Department: Ain
- Arrondissement: Bourg-en-Bresse
- Canton: Replonges
- Intercommunality: CA Bassin de Bourg-en-Bresse

Government
  - Mayor (2026–32): Laurent Viallon
- Area^{1}: 7.99 km^{2} (3.08 sq mi)
- Elevation: 298 m (978 ft)
- Highest elevation: 213 m (699 ft)
- Lowest elevation: 178 m (584 ft)
- Population (2023): 186
  - Density: 23.3/km^{2} (60.3/sq mi)
- Time zone: UTC+01:00 (CET)
  - Summer (DST): UTC+02:00 (CEST)
- INSEE/Postal code: 01406 /01560
- ^{1} French Land Register data, which excludes lakes, ponds, glaciers > 1 km^{2} (0.386 sq mi or 247 acres) and river estuaries.

Servignat (French pronunciation: [sɛʁviɲa]) is a commune in the Ain department in eastern France.

== Population ==
Historical population
Year	Pop.	±% p.a.
1968	194	—
1975	170	−1.87%
1982	130	−3.76%
1990	136	+0.57%
1999	135	−0.08%
2007	153	+1.58%
2012	166	+1.64%
2017	175	+1.06%
2023	186	+1.02%
Source: INSEE

== See also ==
- Communes of the Ain department
