= Reyssouze =

Commune in Auvergne-Rhône-Alpes, France

- Commune
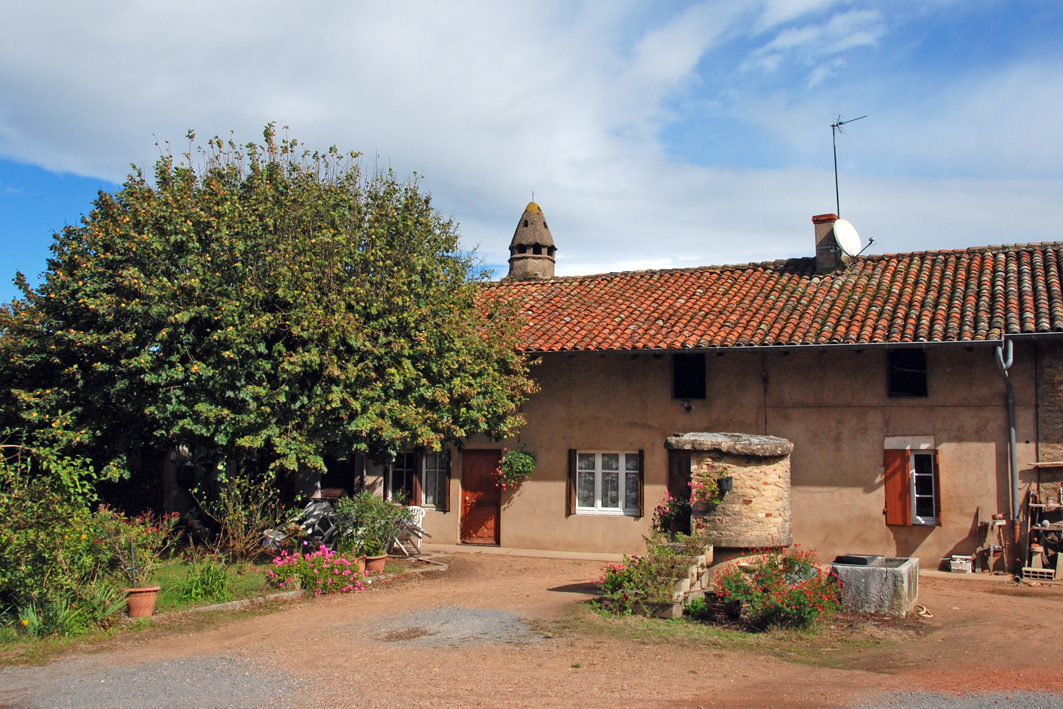
- Coulas farm
- Location of Reyssouze
- Location within France Location within Auvergne-Rhône-Alpes
- Coordinates: 46°25′58″N 4°55′12″E
- Country: France
- Region: Auvergne-Rhône-Alpes
- Department: Ain
- Arrondissement: Bourg-en-Bresse
- Canton: Replonges

Government
  - Mayor (2026–32): Dominique Roudaut
- Area^{1}: 9.54 km^{2} (3.68 sq mi)
- Elevation: 197 m (646 ft)
- Highest elevation: 202 m (663 ft)
- Lowest elevation: 167 m (548 ft)
- Population (2023): 996
  - Density: 104/km^{2} (270/sq mi)
- Time zone: UTC+01:00 (CET)
  - Summer (DST): UTC+02:00 (CEST)
- INSEE/Postal code: 01323 /01190
- ^{1} French Land Register data, which excludes lakes, ponds, glaciers > 1 km^{2} (0.386 sq mi or 247 acres) and river estuaries.

Reyssouze (French pronunciation: [ʁɛsuz]) is a commune in the Ain department in eastern France.

== Population ==
Historical population
Year	Pop.	±% p.a.
1968	616	—
1975	698	+1.80%
1982	716	+0.36%
1990	709	−0.12%
1999	715	+0.09%
2007	870	+2.48%
2012	973	+2.26%
2017	980	+0.14%
2023	996	+0.27%
Source: INSEE

== See also ==
- Communes of the Ain department
