= Saint-Bénigne =

Commune in Auvergne-Rhône-Alpes, France

- Commune
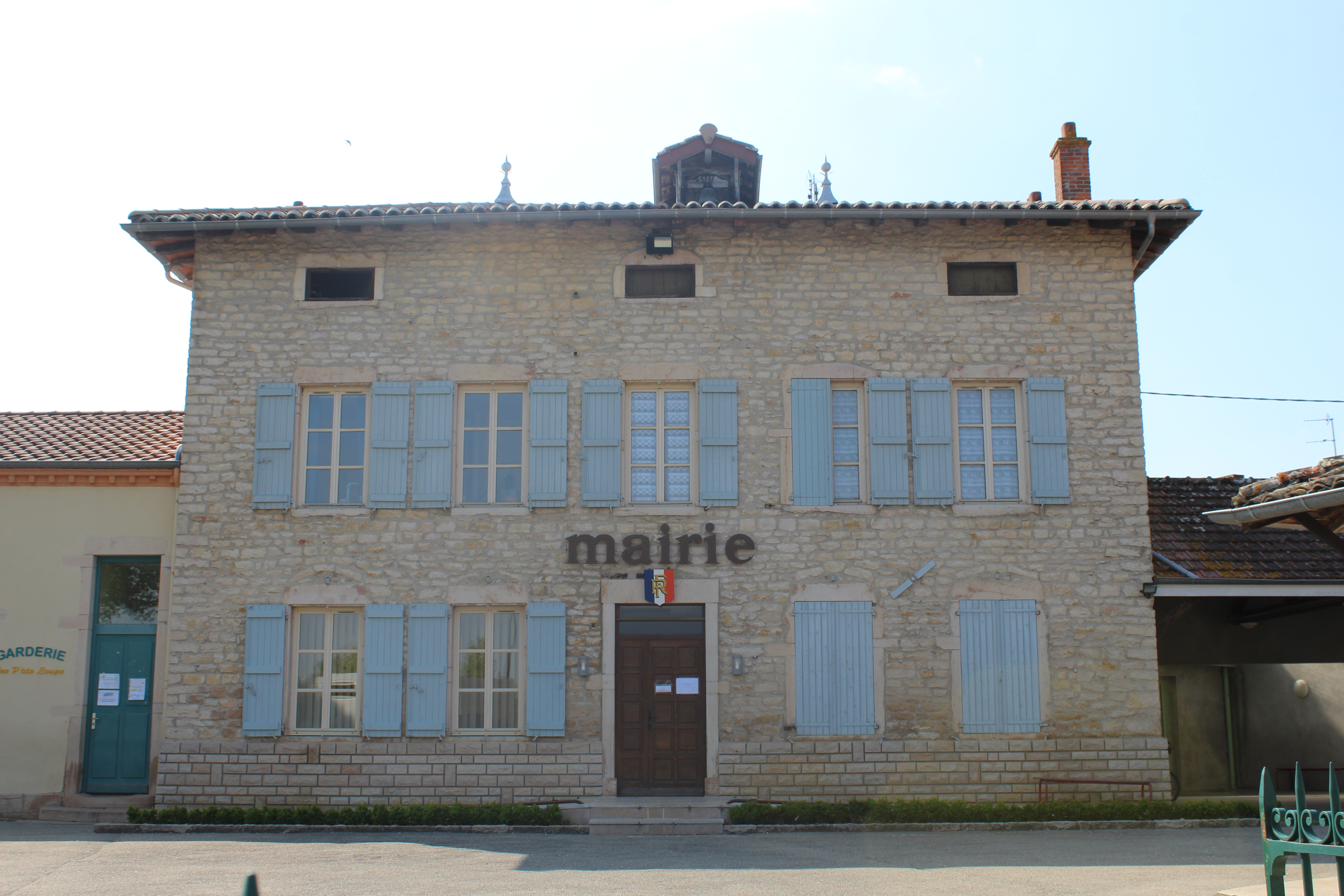
- Town hall
- Location of Saint-Bénigne
- Location within France Location within Auvergne-Rhône-Alpes
- Coordinates: 46°26′23″N 4°58′20″E
- Country: France
- Region: Auvergne-Rhône-Alpes
- Department: Ain
- Arrondissement: Bourg-en-Bresse
- Canton: Replonges
- Intercommunality: Bresse et Saône

Government
  - Mayor (2026–32): Emily Unia
- Area^{1}: 16.49 km^{2} (6.37 sq mi)
- Elevation: 212 m (696 ft)
- Highest elevation: 216 m (709 ft)
- Lowest elevation: 168 m (551 ft)
- Population (2023): 1,359
  - Density: 82.41/km^{2} (213.5/sq mi)
- Time zone: UTC+01:00 (CET)
  - Summer (DST): UTC+02:00 (CEST)
- INSEE/Postal code: 01337 /01190
- ^{1} French Land Register data, which excludes lakes, ponds, glaciers > 1 km^{2} (0.386 sq mi or 247 acres) and river estuaries.

Saint-Bénigne (French pronunciation: [sɛ̃ beniɲ]) is a commune in the Ain department in eastern France.

== Population ==
Historical population
Year	Pop.	±% p.a.
1968	663	—
1975	631	−0.70%
1982	702	+1.53%
1990	823	+2.01%
1999	817	−0.08%
2007	1,108	+3.88%
2012	1,209	+1.76%
2017	1,265	+0.91%
2023	1,359	+1.20%
Source: INSEE

== See also ==
- Communes of the Ain department
