= Asnières-sur-Saône =

Commune in Auvergne-Rhône-Alpes, France

- Commune
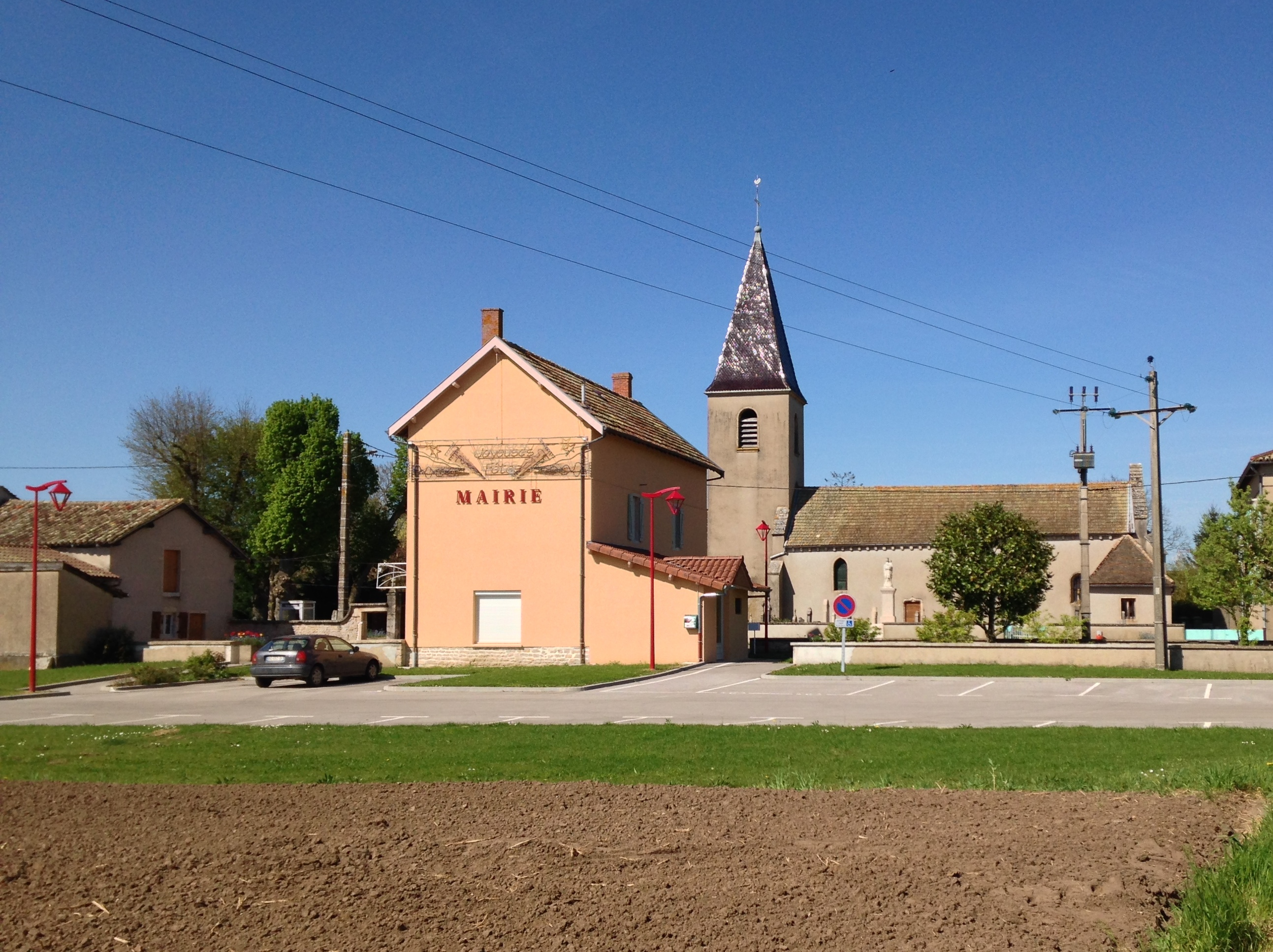
- Town hall and the church
- Location of Asnières-sur-Saône
- Location within France Location within Auvergne-Rhône-Alpes
- Coordinates: 46°22′59″N 4°52′59″E
- Country: France
- Region: Auvergne-Rhône-Alpes
- Department: Ain
- Arrondissement: Bourg-en-Bresse
- Canton: Replonges
- Intercommunality: Bresse et Saône

Government
  - Mayor (2026–32): Corinne Segain Rigaud
- Area^{1}: 4.7 km^{2} (1.8 sq mi)
- Highest elevation: 175 m (574 ft)
- Lowest elevation: 167 m (548 ft)
- Population (2023): 78
  - Density: 17/km^{2} (43/sq mi)
- Time zone: UTC+01:00 (CET)
  - Summer (DST): UTC+02:00 (CEST)
- INSEE/Postal code: 01023 /01570
- ^{1} French Land Register data, which excludes lakes, ponds, glaciers > 1 km^{2} (0.386 sq mi or 247 acres) and river estuaries.

Asnières-sur-Saône (French pronunciation: [ɑnjɛʁ syʁ son]; literally "Asnières on Saône") is a commune in the Ain department in the Auvergne-Rhône-Alpes region of eastern France.

== Geography ==
Asnières-sur-Saône is on the bank of the Saône river some 15 km north of Mâcon and 50 km south of Chalons-sur-Saône. The commune can be accessed on the D18 road from Quart-d'Aval in the north-east to the village. The road continues south as the D1 road then turns south-east to Manziat. The D1E branches off in the south of the commune and goes south to Le Chateau. The commune consists entirely of farmland with no other villages or hamlets.

The Saône river forms the entire western border of the commune with no bridges across the river. A canal runs parallel to the river joining the river in the south and joining the Bief de la Jutane in the north which forms part of the northern border.

== History ==
The village can be traced back to the 10th century under the name Asnerias. It was the possession of the Counts of Mâcon and Cluny Abbey.

== Administration ==
Mayors of Asnières-sur-Saône

From	To	Name	Party	Position
1998	2005	Roland Golin		Territorial Official
2005	2014	Jean-Marc Willems		
2014	2020	Nadine Agremont		
2020	2026	Jean-Marc Willems		
2026	incumbent	Corinne Segain Rigaud		

=== Twinning ===
Asnières-sur-Saône has twinning associations with:

- Bad Waldsee (Germany) since 1991.

== Population ==
Historical population
Year	Pop.	±% p.a.
1968	103	—
1975	94	−1.30%
1982	95	+0.15%
1990	68	−4.09%
1999	69	+0.16%
2007	86	+2.79%
2012	72	−3.49%
2017	66	−1.73%
2023	78	+2.82%
Source: INSEE

== Sights ==
- The Port of Asnières

=== Protected natural areas ===
The floodplains of the Val de Saône have been classified as protected areas since 1994.

== Personalities ==
- José Mingret (1880–1969), French painter, was buried in Asnieres-sur-Saône.

== See also ==
- Communes of the Ain department

=== External links ===
- Asnières-sur-Saône on Géoportail, National Geographic Institute (IGN) website (in French)
- Asnieres on the 1750 Cassini Map
