= Vernoux =

Commune in Auvergne-Rhône-Alpes, France

Vernoux Vèrnox (Arpitan)
- Commune
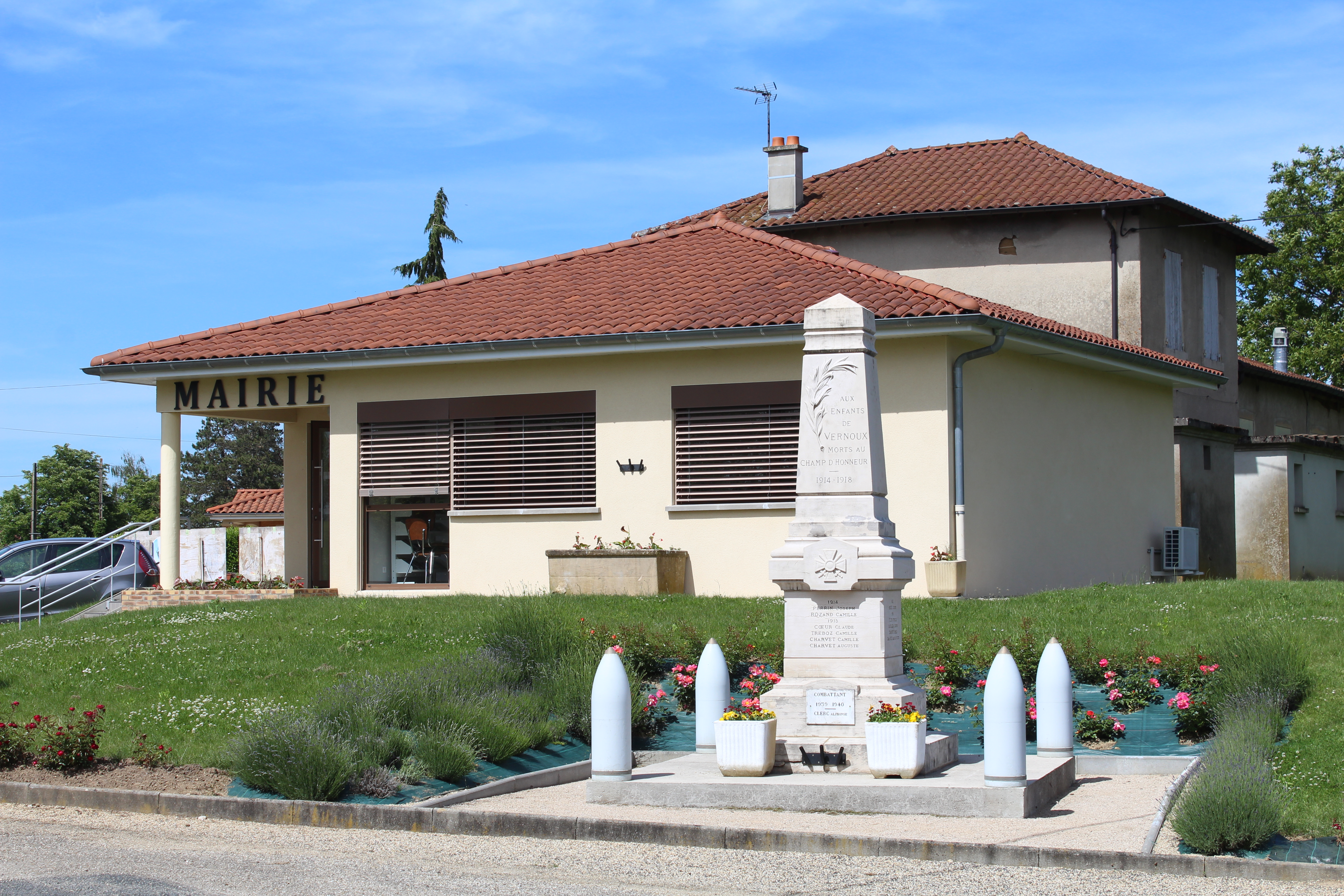
- Town hall
- Location of Vernoux
- Location within France Location within Auvergne-Rhône-Alpes
- Coordinates: 46°28′55″N 5°06′39″E
- Country: France
- Region: Auvergne-Rhône-Alpes
- Department: Ain
- Arrondissement: Bourg-en-Bresse
- Canton: Replonges
- Intercommunality: CA Bassin de Bourg-en-Bresse

Government
  - Mayor (2026–32): Laurent Martin
- Area^{1}: 10.2 km^{2} (3.9 sq mi)
- Elevation: 216 m (709 ft)
- Highest elevation: 216 m (709 ft)
- Lowest elevation: 187 m (614 ft)
- Population (2023): 290
  - Density: 28/km^{2} (74/sq mi)
- Time zone: UTC+01:00 (CET)
  - Summer (DST): UTC+02:00 (CEST)
- INSEE/Postal code: 01433 /01560
- ^{1} French Land Register data, which excludes lakes, ponds, glaciers > 1 km^{2} (0.386 sq mi or 247 acres) and river estuaries.

Vernoux (French pronunciation: [vɛʁnu]; Arpitan: Vèrnox) is a commune in the Ain department in eastern France.

== Population ==
Historical population
Year	Pop.	±% p.a.
1968	208	—
1975	190	−1.28%
1982	151	−3.23%
1990	148	−0.25%
1999	127	−1.69%
2007	198	+5.71%
2012	319	+10.01%
2017	330	+0.68%
2023	290	−2.13%
Source: INSEE

== See also ==
- Communes of the Ain department
