= Canton of Bourg-en-Bresse-Sud =

Coordinates: 46°12′N 5°13′E

Bourg-en-Bresse-Sud
- Former canton
- Interactive map of Bourg-en-Bresse-Sud
- Country: France
- Region: Auvergne-Rhône-Alpes
- Department: Ain
- No. of communes: {{{nbcomm}}}
- Disbanded: 2015
- Population (2012): 15,302

The canton of Bourg-en-Bresse-Sud is a former administrative division in eastern France. It comprised part of the commune of Bourg-en-Bresse. It was disbanded following the French canton reorganisation which came into effect in March 2015. It had 15,302 inhabitants (2012).

== Demographics ==
Historical population
Year	Pop.	±%
1990	12,209	—
1999	14,616	+19.7%
2012	15,302	+4.7%

== See also ==
- Cantons of the Ain department
- Communes of France
