= Saint-Trivier-de-Courtes =

Commune in Auvergne-Rhône-Alpes, France

- Commune
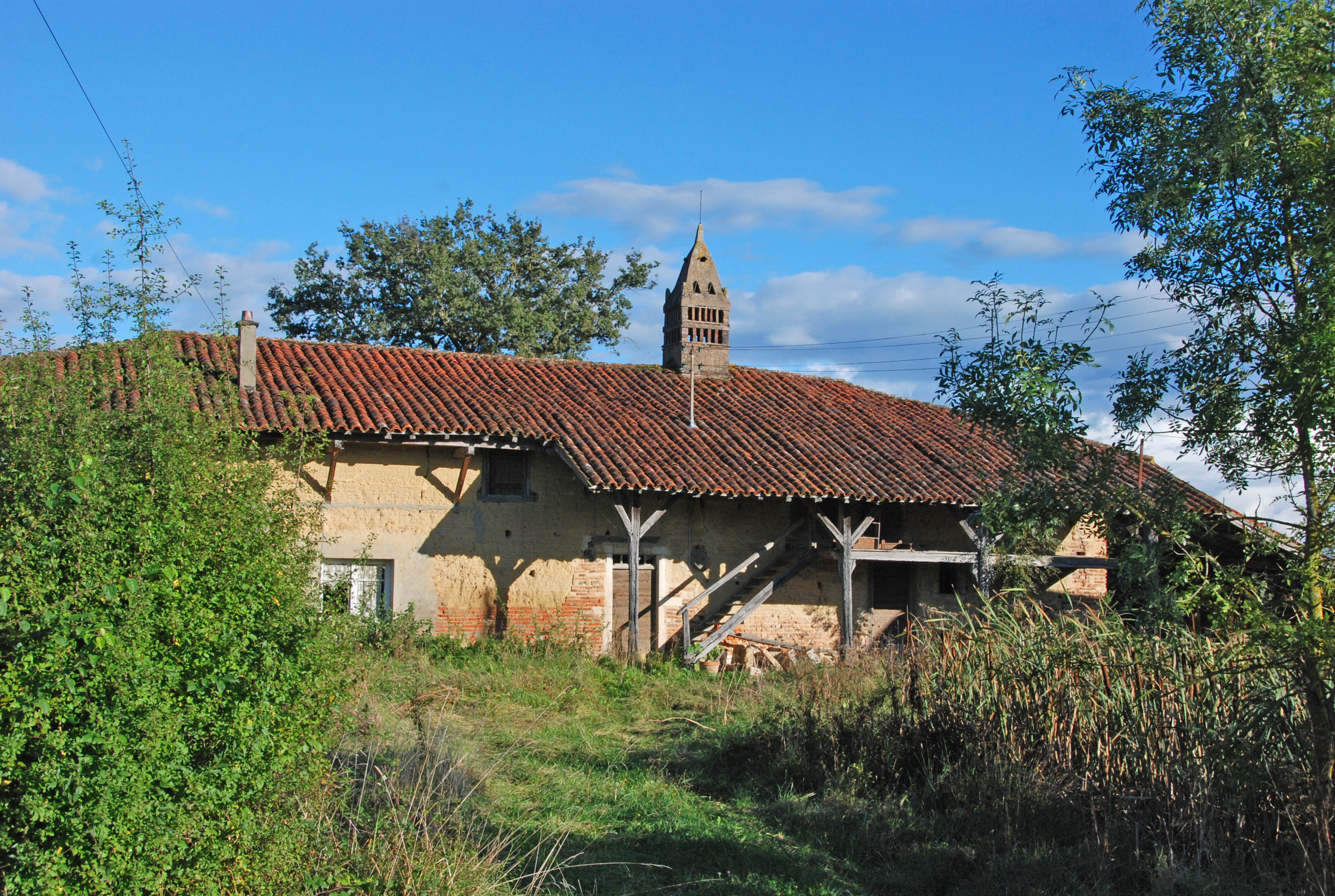
- Granval farm

- Coat of arms
- Location of Saint-Trivier-de-Courtes
- Location within France Location within Auvergne-Rhône-Alpes
- Coordinates: 46°27′37″N 5°04′56″E
- Country: France
- Region: Auvergne-Rhône-Alpes
- Department: Ain
- Arrondissement: Bourg-en-Bresse
- Canton: Replonges
- Intercommunality: CA Bassin de Bourg-en-Bresse

Government
  - Mayor (2026–32): Christophe Disses
- Area^{1}: 16.53 km^{2} (6.38 sq mi)
- Highest elevation: 218 m (715 ft)
- Lowest elevation: 184 m (604 ft)
- Population (2023): 1,125
  - Density: 68.06/km^{2} (176.3/sq mi)
- Time zone: UTC+01:00 (CET)
  - Summer (DST): UTC+02:00 (CEST)
- INSEE/Postal code: 01388 /01560
- ^{1} French Land Register data, which excludes lakes, ponds, glaciers > 1 km^{2} (0.386 sq mi or 247 acres) and river estuaries.

Saint-Trivier-de-Courtes (French pronunciation: [sɛ̃ tʁivje də kuʁt], literally Saint-Trivier of Courtes) is a commune in the Ain department in eastern France.

== Politics and administration ==
=== List of mayors ===
List of successive Mayors of Saint-Trivier-de-Courtes
In office		Name	Party
21 January 1878	12 June 1878	Paul François Vivier	
June 1995	March 2001	François Pittner	
March 2001	November 2010	Jean-Paul Chevalier	PS
2014	2020	Gilles Peisson	
2020	2026	Yves Bernard	
2026	Incumbent	Christophe Disses	

== Population ==
Historical population
Year	Pop.	±% p.a.
1968	1,066	—
1975	1,076	+0.13%
1982	1,104	+0.37%
1990	1,064	−0.46%
1999	935	−1.43%
2007	970	+0.46%
2012	1,080	+2.17%
2017	1,093	+0.24%
2023	1,125	+0.48%
Source: INSEE

== See also ==
- Communes of the Ain department
