= Pont-de-Vaux =

Commune in Auvergne-Rhône-Alpes, France

- Commune
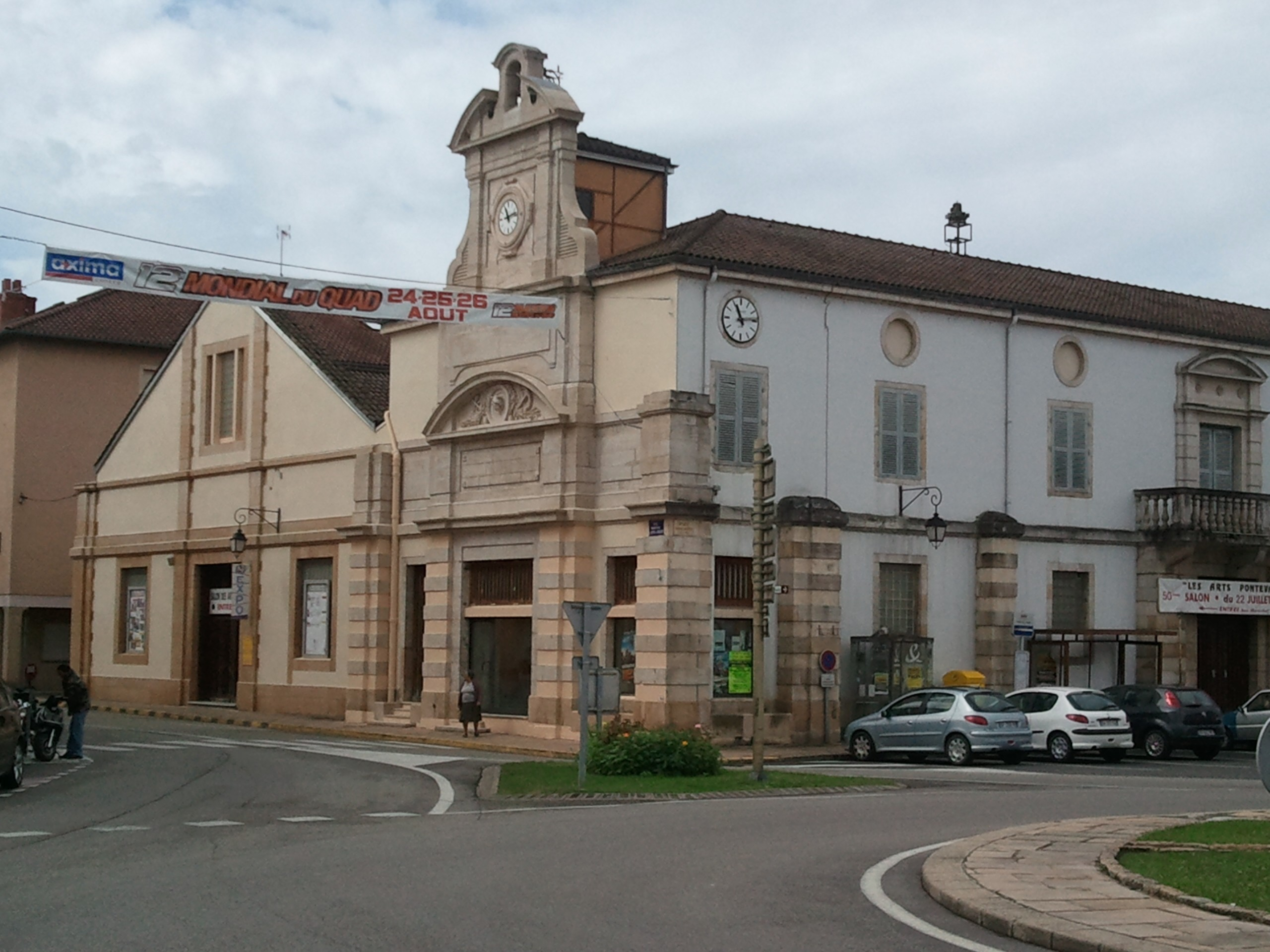
- Train station and market

- Coat of arms
- Location of Pont-de-Vaux
- Location within France Location within Auvergne-Rhône-Alpes
- Coordinates: 46°25′55″N 4°56′17″E
- Country: France
- Region: Auvergne-Rhône-Alpes
- Department: Ain
- Arrondissement: Bourg-en-Bresse
- Canton: Replonges

Government
  - Mayor (2026–32): Yves Pauget
- Area^{1}: 7.54 km^{2} (2.91 sq mi)
- Elevation: 177 m (581 ft)
- Highest elevation: 204 m (669 ft)
- Lowest elevation: 169 m (554 ft)
- Population (2023): 2,204
  - Density: 292/km^{2} (757/sq mi)
- Time zone: UTC+01:00 (CET)
  - Summer (DST): UTC+02:00 (CEST)
- INSEE/Postal code: 01305 /01190
- ^{1} French Land Register data, which excludes lakes, ponds, glaciers > 1 km^{2} (0.386 sq mi or 247 acres) and river estuaries.

Pont-de-Vaux (French pronunciation: [pɔ̃ də vo]) is a commune in the Ain department in eastern France.

== Population ==
Historical population

Year	Pop.	±% p.a.
1793	2,787	—
1800	2,806	+0.10%
1806	2,789	−0.10%
1821	2,888	+0.23%
1831	3,189	+1.00%
1836	3,140	−0.31%
1841	3,136	−0.03%
1846	3,067	−0.44%
1851	3,123	+0.36%
1856	3,061	−0.40%
1861	3,077	+0.10%
1866	3,117	+0.26%
1872	2,533	−3.40%
1876	3,011	+4.42%
1881	2,853	−1.07%
1886	2,754	−0.70%
1891	2,669	−0.63%
1896	2,617	−0.39%
1901	2,483	−1.05%

Year	Pop.	±% p.a.
1906	2,452	−0.25%
1911	2,449	−0.02%
1921	2,155	−1.27%
1926	2,149	−0.06%
1931	2,028	−1.15%
1936	2,002	−0.26%
1946	1,927	−0.38%
1954	1,979	+0.33%
1962	2,068	+0.55%
1968	2,106	+0.30%
1975	2,096	−0.07%
1982	2,050	−0.32%
1990	1,913	−0.86%
1999	2,004	+0.52%
2007	2,130	+0.77%
2012	2,261	+1.20%
2017	2,258	−0.03%
2023	2,204	−0.40%

Source: EHESS and INSEE (1968-2023)

== See also ==
- Communes of the Ain department
- List of medieval bridges in France
