= Chevroux, Ain =

Commune in Auvergne-Rhône-Alpes, France

Chevroux
- Commune
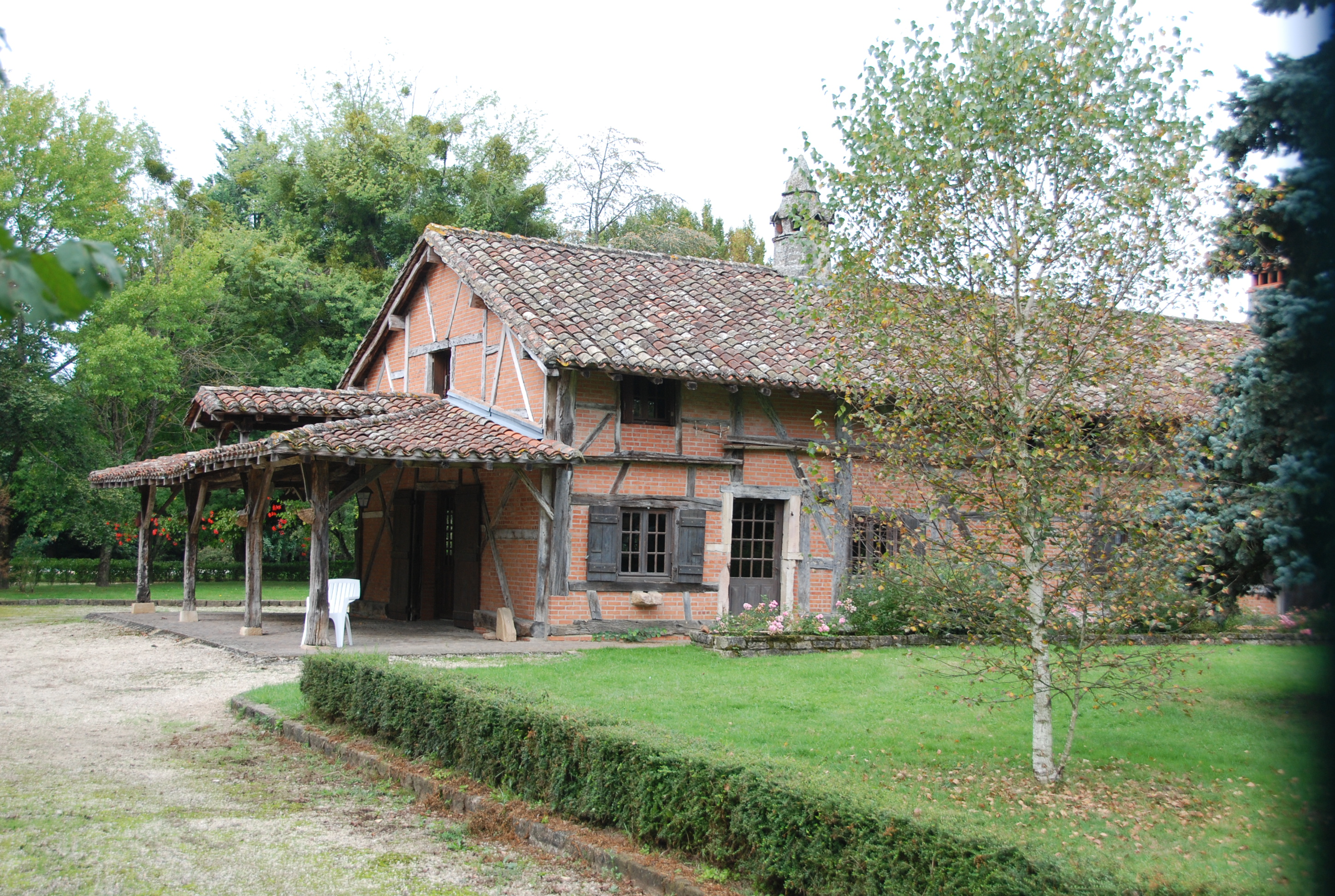
- La Bourlière farm

- Coat of arms
- Location of Chevroux
- Location within France Location within Auvergne-Rhône-Alpes
- Coordinates: 46°22′53″N 4°56′58″E
- Country: France
- Region: Auvergne-Rhône-Alpes
- Department: Ain
- Arrondissement: Bourg-en-Bresse
- Canton: Replonges
- Intercommunality: Bresse et Saône

Government
  - Mayor (2026–32): Dominique Savot
- Area^{1}: 17.2 km^{2} (6.6 sq mi)
- Elevation: 200 m (660 ft)
- Highest elevation: 208 m (682 ft)
- Lowest elevation: 176 m (577 ft)
- Population (2023): 990
  - Density: 58/km^{2} (150/sq mi)
- Time zone: UTC+01:00 (CET)
  - Summer (DST): UTC+02:00 (CEST)
- INSEE/Postal code: 01102 /01190
- ^{1} French Land Register data, which excludes lakes, ponds, glaciers > 1 km^{2} (0.386 sq mi or 247 acres) and river estuaries.

Chevroux (French pronunciation: [ʃəvʁu]) is a commune in the Ain department in eastern France.

== Population ==
Historical population
Year	Pop.	±% p.a.
1968	587	—
1975	516	−1.82%
1982	517	+0.03%
1990	586	+1.58%
1999	657	+1.28%
2007	847	+3.23%
2012	941	+2.13%
2017	952	+0.23%
2023	990	+0.65%
Source: INSEE

== See also ==
- Communes of the Ain department
