= Vésines =

Commune in Auvergne-Rhône-Alpes, France

- Commune
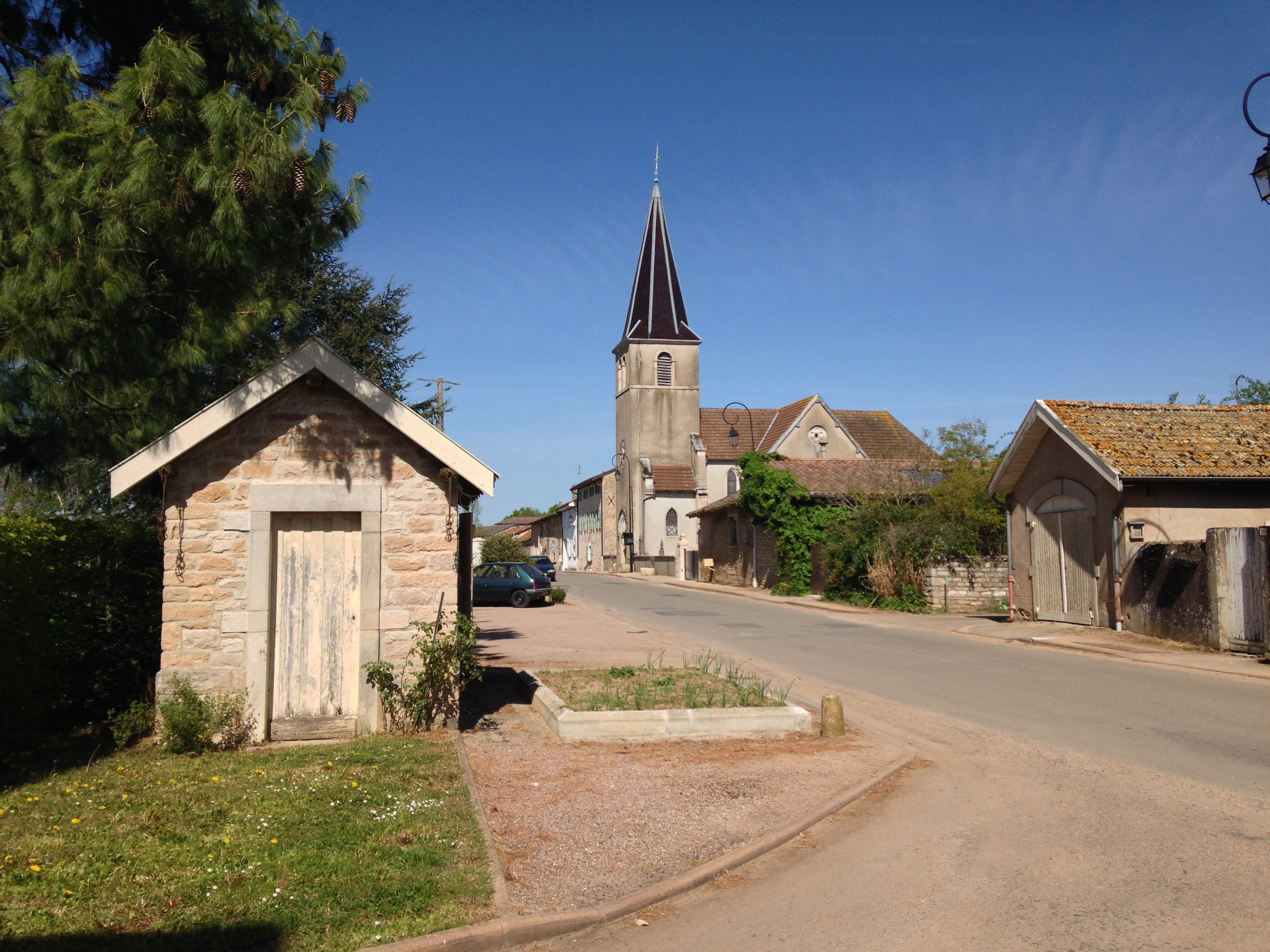
- Location of Vésines
- Location within France Location within Auvergne-Rhône-Alpes
- Coordinates: 46°21′00″N 4°52′00″E
- Country: France
- Region: Auvergne-Rhône-Alpes
- Department: Ain
- Arrondissement: Bourg-en-Bresse
- Canton: Replonges
- Intercommunality: Bresse et Saône

Government
  - Mayor (2026–32): Tristan Varlet
- Area^{1}: 3.9 km^{2} (1.5 sq mi)
- Elevation: 172 m (564 ft)
- Highest elevation: 176 m (577 ft)
- Lowest elevation: 167 m (548 ft)
- Population (2023): 96
  - Density: 25/km^{2} (64/sq mi)
- Time zone: UTC+01:00 (CET)
  - Summer (DST): UTC+02:00 (CEST)
- INSEE/Postal code: 01439 /01570
- ^{1} French Land Register data, which excludes lakes, ponds, glaciers > 1 km^{2} (0.386 sq mi or 247 acres) and river estuaries.

Vésines (French pronunciation: [vezin]; Arpitan: Vèsenes) is a commune in the Ain department in eastern France.

== Population ==
Historical population
Year	Pop.	±% p.a.
1968	143	—
1975	121	−2.36%
1982	116	−0.60%
1990	108	−0.89%
1999	113	+0.50%
2007	90	−2.80%
2012	99	+1.92%
2017	99	+0.00%
2023	96	−0.51%
Source: INSEE

== See also ==
- Communes of the Ain department
