= Manziat =

Commune in Auvergne-Rhône-Alpes, France

- Commune
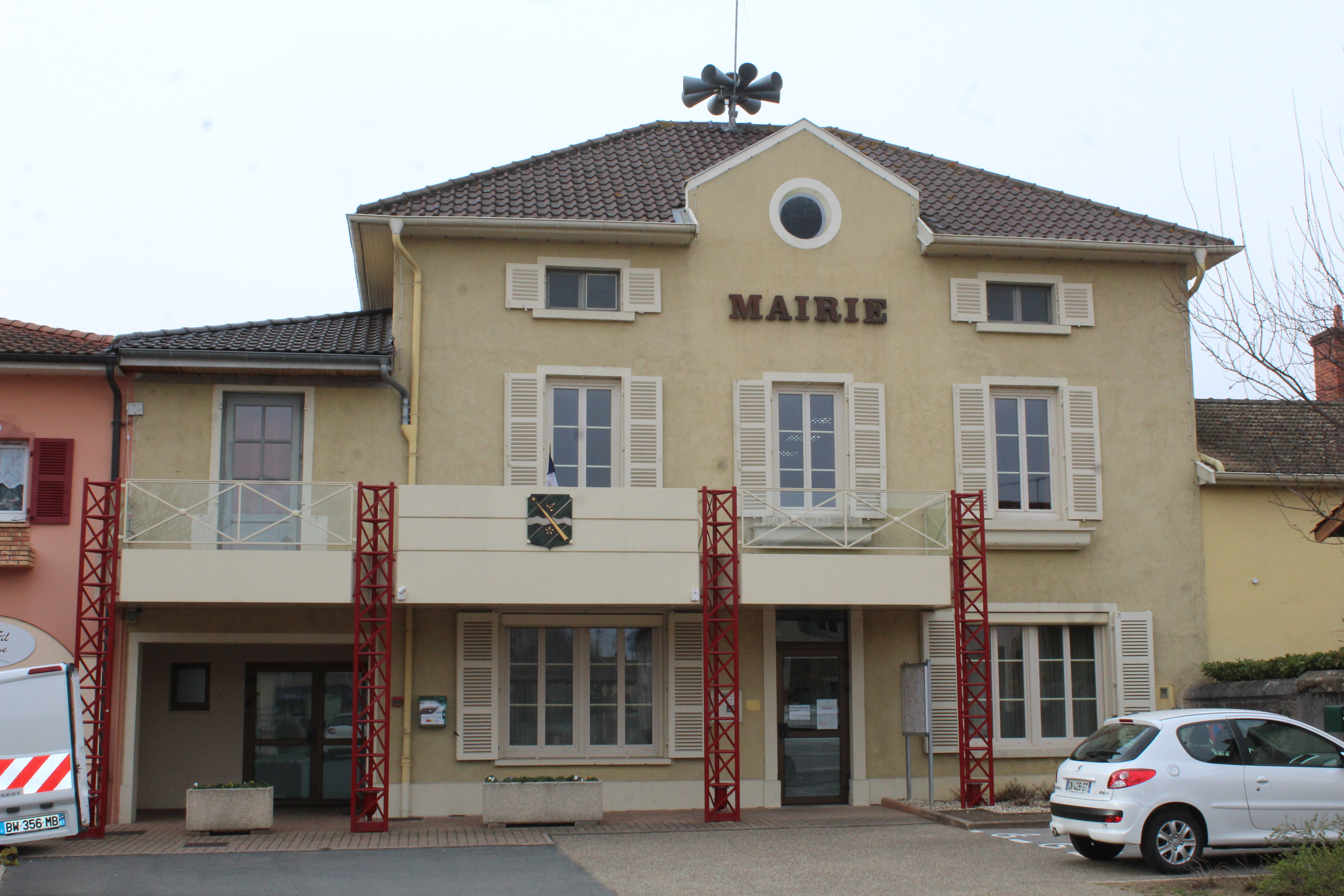
- Town hall

- Coat of arms
- Location of Manziat
- Location within France Location within Auvergne-Rhône-Alpes
- Coordinates: 46°21′N 4°54′E
- Country: France
- Region: Auvergne-Rhône-Alpes
- Department: Ain
- Arrondissement: Bourg-en-Bresse
- Canton: Replonges
- Intercommunality: Bresse et Saône

Government
  - Mayor (2026–32): Denis Lardet
- Area^{1}: 12.63 km^{2} (4.88 sq mi)
- Elevation: 200 m (660 ft)
- Highest elevation: 207 m (679 ft)
- Lowest elevation: 170 m (560 ft)
- Population (2023): 2,018
  - Density: 159.8/km^{2} (413.8/sq mi)
- Time zone: UTC+01:00 (CET)
  - Summer (DST): UTC+02:00 (CEST)
- INSEE/Postal code: 01231 /01570
- ^{1} French Land Register data, which excludes lakes, ponds, glaciers > 1 km^{2} (0.386 sq mi or 247 acres) and river estuaries.

Manziat (French pronunciation: [mɑ̃zja]) is a commune in the Ain department in eastern France.

== Population ==
Historical population
Year	Pop.	±% p.a.
1968	1,197	—
1975	1,201	+0.05%
1982	1,451	+2.74%
1990	1,482	+0.26%
1999	1,598	+0.84%
2007	1,859	+1.91%
2012	1,940	+0.86%
2017	1,963	+0.24%
2023	2,018	+0.46%
Source: INSEE

== See also ==
- Communes of the Ain department
