= Bâgé-le-Châtel =

Commune in Auvergne-Rhône-Alpes, France

- Commune
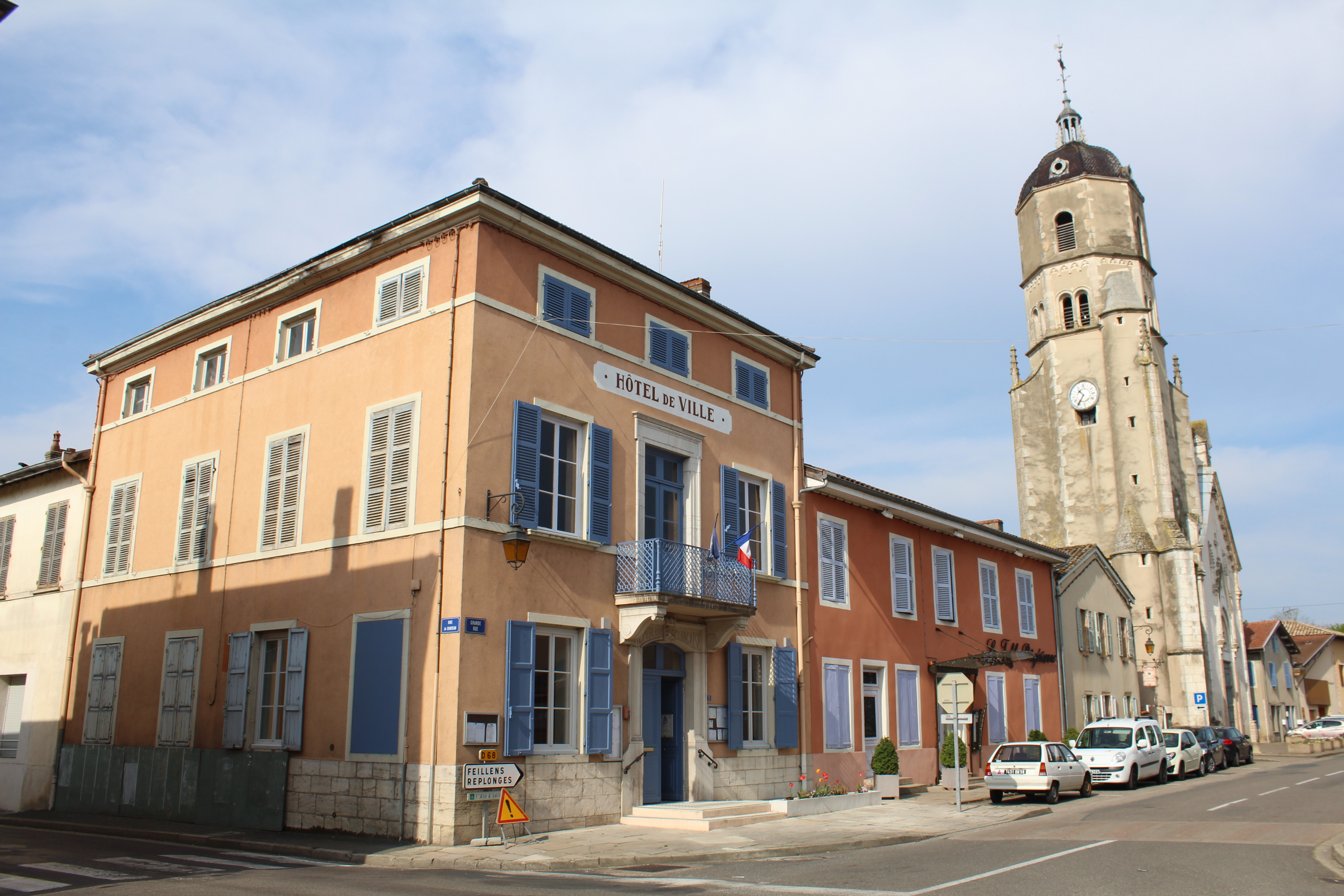
- Town hall and the church

- Coat of arms
- Location of Bâgé-le-Châtel
- Location within France Location within Auvergne-Rhône-Alpes
- Coordinates: 46°18′00″N 4°56′00″E
- Country: France
- Region: Auvergne-Rhône-Alpes
- Department: Ain
- Arrondissement: Bourg-en-Bresse
- Canton: Replonges
- Intercommunality: Bresse et Saône

Government
  - Mayor (2026–32): Eric Olivier Fricou
- Area^{1}: 0.88 km^{2} (0.34 sq mi)
- Elevation: 209 m (686 ft)
- Highest elevation: 211 m (692 ft)
- Lowest elevation: 184 m (604 ft)
- Population (2023): 971
  - Density: 1,100/km^{2} (2,900/sq mi)
- Time zone: UTC+01:00 (CET)
  - Summer (DST): UTC+02:00 (CEST)
- INSEE/Postal code: 01026 /01380
- Website: https://bagelechatel.fr/
- ^{1} French Land Register data, which excludes lakes, ponds, glaciers > 1 km^{2} (0.386 sq mi or 247 acres) and river estuaries.

Bâgé-le-Châtel (French pronunciation: [bɑʒe lə ʃɑtɛl]) is a commune in the Ain department in central-eastern France.

== History ==
The name of Bâgé-le-Châtel comes from a Gallo-Roman villa belonging to a certain Balgiasius.

In the Middle Ages, three parishes were formed on the territory of the Seigneurs de Bâgé: Bâgé-le-Châtel around the château, Saint-André where the church was built, and Bâgé-la-Ville, the largest town.

Bâgé-le-Châtel is the ancient capital of Bresse. In 1272, Bresse became part of Savoy when Sibylle de Bâgé, sole heir, married Amadeus V, Count of Savoy. Bourg (today Bourg-en-Bresse), a fortified bastion with 3400 inhabitants, became the capital of Bresse. Bâgé remained a village, whereas Bourg expanded beyond its walls to become the city of today.

== Population ==
Historical population
Year	Pop.	±% p.a.
1968	568	—
1975	588	+0.50%
1982	669	+1.86%
1990	751	+1.46%
1999	762	+0.16%
2007	798	+0.58%
2012	829	+0.77%
2017	923	+2.17%
2023	971	+0.85%
Source: INSEE

== See also ==
- Communes of the Ain department
