= Reyssouze (river) =

River in eastern France

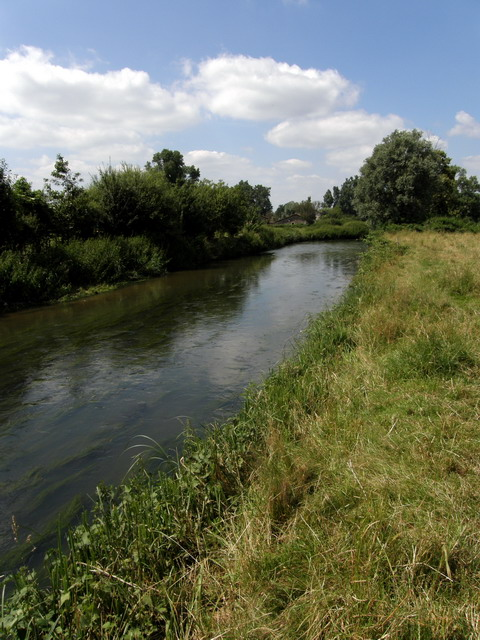

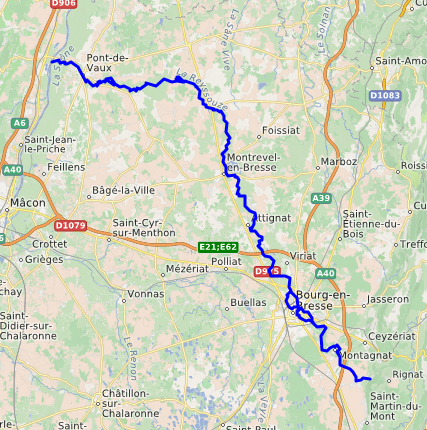

Location
- Country: France

Physical characteristics
- Mouth
  - location: Saône
  - coordinates: 46°26′33″N 4°53′40″E
- Length: 75 km (47 mi)

Basin features
- Progression: Saône→ Rhône→ Mediterranean Sea

The Reyssouze (French pronunciation: [ʁɛsuz]) is a river in the Ain department in eastern France. It is a left tributary of the Saône, which it joins near Pont-de-Vaux. It is 75.1 km (46.7 mi) long. Its source is in Journans, in the Bresse region. The Reyssouze flows generally northwest through the following communes: Montagnat, Bourg-en-Bresse, Attignat, Montrevel-en-Bresse and Pont-de-Vaux.
