= Canton of Treffort-Cuisiat =

Coordinates: 46°16′20″N 5°22′12″E

Treffort
- Former canton
- Interactive map of Treffort
- Country: France
- Region: Auvergne-Rhône-Alpes
- Department: Ain
- No. of communes: {{{nbcomm}}}
- Disbanded: 2015
- Area: 166.26 km^{2} (64.19 sq mi)
- Population (2012): 8,281
  - Density: 49.81/km^{2} (129.0/sq mi)

The canton of Treffort-Cuisiat is a former administrative division in eastern France. It was disbanded following the French canton reorganisation which came into effect in March 2015. It consisted of 9 communes, which joined the new canton of Saint-Étienne-du-Bois in 2015. It had 8,281 inhabitants (2012).

The canton comprised 9 communes:

- Chavannes-sur-Suran
- Corveissiat
- Courmangoux
- Germagnat
- Meillonnas
- Pouillat
- Pressiat
- Saint-Étienne-du-Bois
- Treffort-Cuisiat

== Demographics ==
Historical population Canton of Treffort-Cuisiat
Year	1962	1968	1975	1982	1990	1999
Pop.	4,326	4,664	4,525	5,728	6,274	6,815
±%	—	+7.8%	−3.0%	+26.6%	+9.5%	+8.6%
From the year 1962 on: No double counting – residents of multiple communes (e.g. students and military personnel) are counted only once. Source: INSEE

== See also ==
- Cantons of the Ain department
