= Georges Jules Piquet =

British Colonial Official

Georges Jules Piquet (January 13, 1839 – January 18, 1923) was Governor General for French India (Établissements français dans l'Inde) in the Second French Colonial Empire under Third Republic.

Georges Jules Piquet was the son of Victor Piquet (1795-1876), surveyor and owner of Château de Chevignat near Courmangoux, of which he was mayor, and Pauline Marchand (1813-1873). He graduated as valedictorian from the Brest Naval School in 1856. He was aide-de-camp to Admiral Léonard Victor Charner, before becoming an ensign in June 1861. He served in the ports of Cochinchina, as second inspector of native affairs at Tây Ninh, then was promoted to lieutenant and inspector of reviews at Mỹ Tho. In February 1869, he was appointed General Secretary to the Director of the Interior in Cochinchina, based in Saigon.

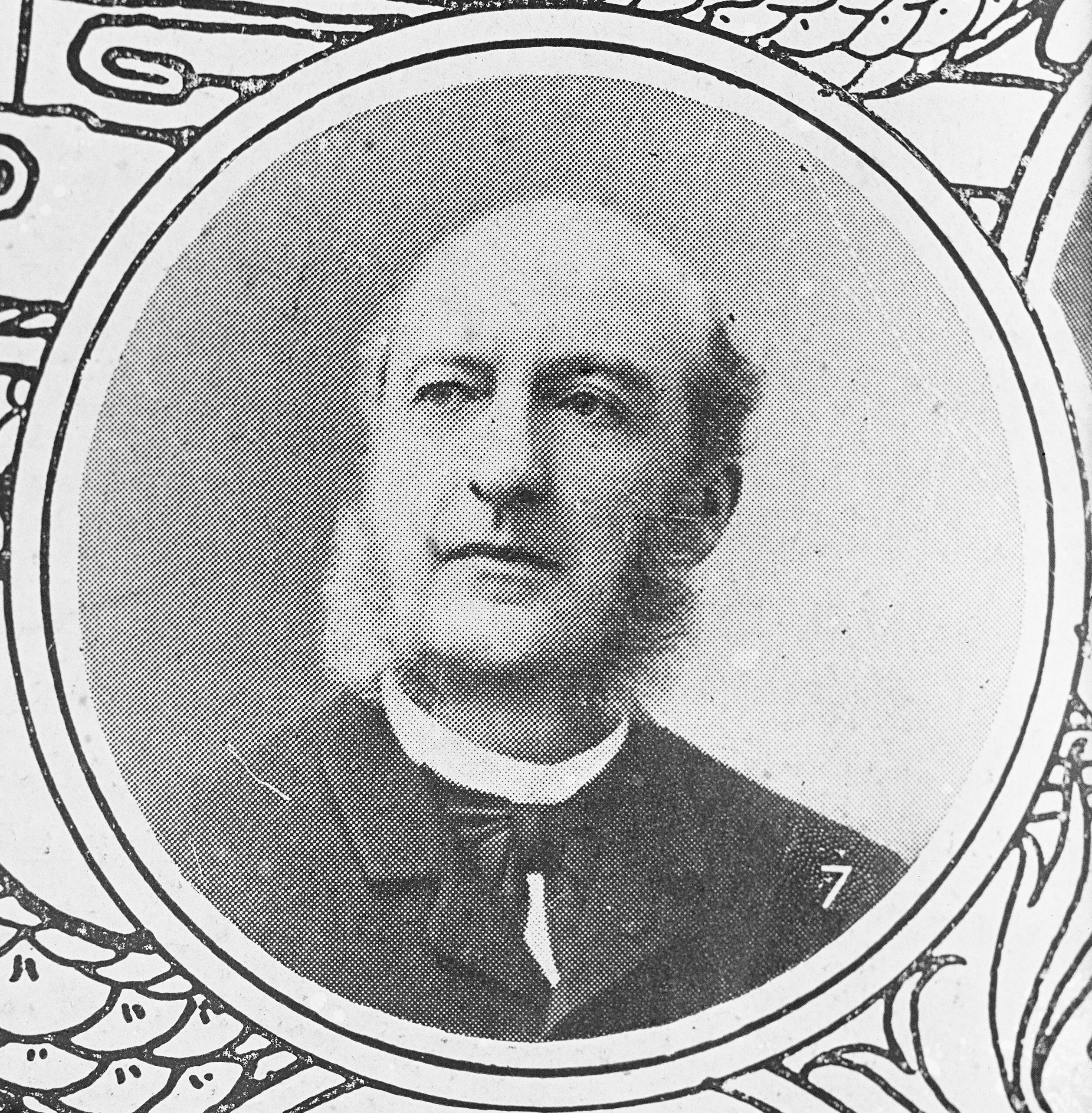
Portrait of Georges Jules Piquet, 1906

He was named Officer of the Legion of Honor by decree on July 18, 1876.

In May 1886, he was appointed Governor of Cambodia, then in November 1887, on an interim basis, Governor of Cochinchina. In October 1888, he became Governor General of French India. In May 1889, he was appointed Governor General of Indochina, a position he held until April 1891.

During his retirement, he lived in the family château at Chevignat and became mayor of Courmangoux, where he died on January 18, 1923. For a time, he was general councillor for the canton of Treffort.

== Titles held ==
- 1861: Order of Isabella the Catholic
- 1878: Commander's Cross of the Order of Charles III
- 1886: Grand Officer of the Royal Order of Cambodia
- 1887: Grand Officer of the Dragon of Annam
- 1889: Grand Cordon of the Royal Order of Cambodia

Government offices
Preceded by Édouard Manès	Gouverneur Général de l'Inde française 1888–1889	Succeeded by Louis Hippolyte Marie Nouet
