= Lac de Conflans =

Lake in eastern France

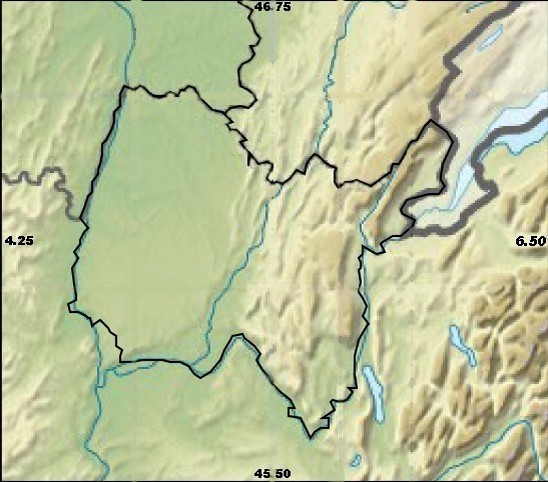
- Location within Ain
- Location: Ain/Jura
- Coordinates: 46°16′00″N 5°30′20″E
- Primary inflows: Valouse
- Primary outflows: Ain
- Basin countries: France
- Max. length: 950 m (3,120 ft)
- Max. width: 250 m (820 ft)
- Surface area: 20 ha (49 acres)
- Average depth: 3 m (9.8 ft) (estimated from text)
- Max. depth: 8 m (26 ft)
- Surface elevation: 285 m (935 ft)

Lac de Conflans is a lake at the confluence of the rivers Ain and Valouse. It lies in the communes of Thoirette, in the Jura department, and Corveissiat in the Ain department of France.
