= Lac de Coiselet =

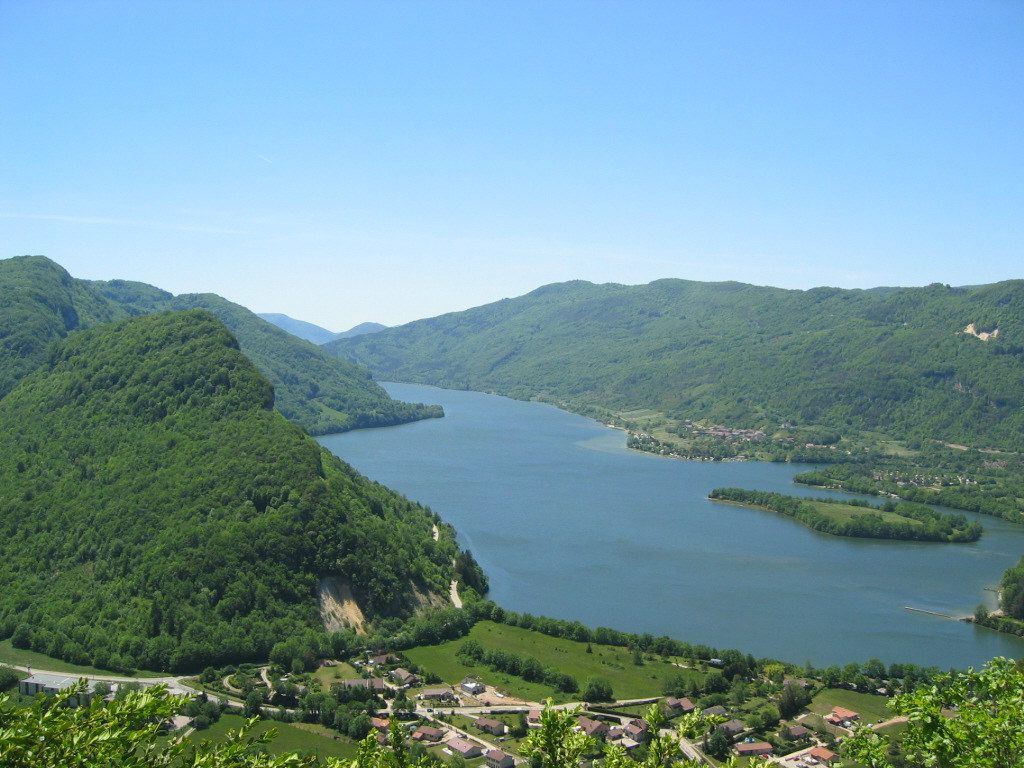

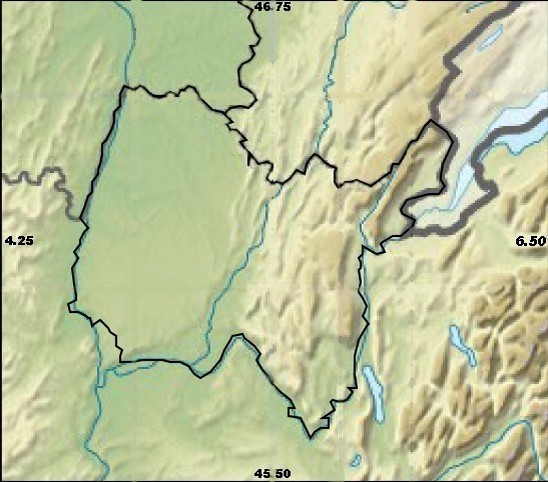
- Location within Ain
- Location: Ain/Jura
- Coordinates: 46°19′40″N 5°37′00″E
- Type: reservoir
- Primary inflows: Ain, Bienne
- Primary outflows: Ain
- Basin countries: France
- Max. length: 6 km (3.7 mi)
- Surface area: 3.8 km^{2} (1.5 sq mi)
- Average depth: 9.5 m (31 ft)
- Max. depth: 30 m (98 ft)

Lac de Coiselet (French pronunciation: [lak də kwazlɛ]) is a reservoir on the border between the Ain and Jura departments in France. Its surface area is 3.8 km^{2}. The lake formed in 1970 after the Barrage de Coiselet was built at the confluence of the rivers Ain and Bienne.
