= Cize =

Cize may refer to:

- Cesária Évora (1941–2011), Cape Verdean singer
- Cize, Ain, commune in France
- Cize, Jura, commune in France
