= Bienne (river) =

River in eastern France

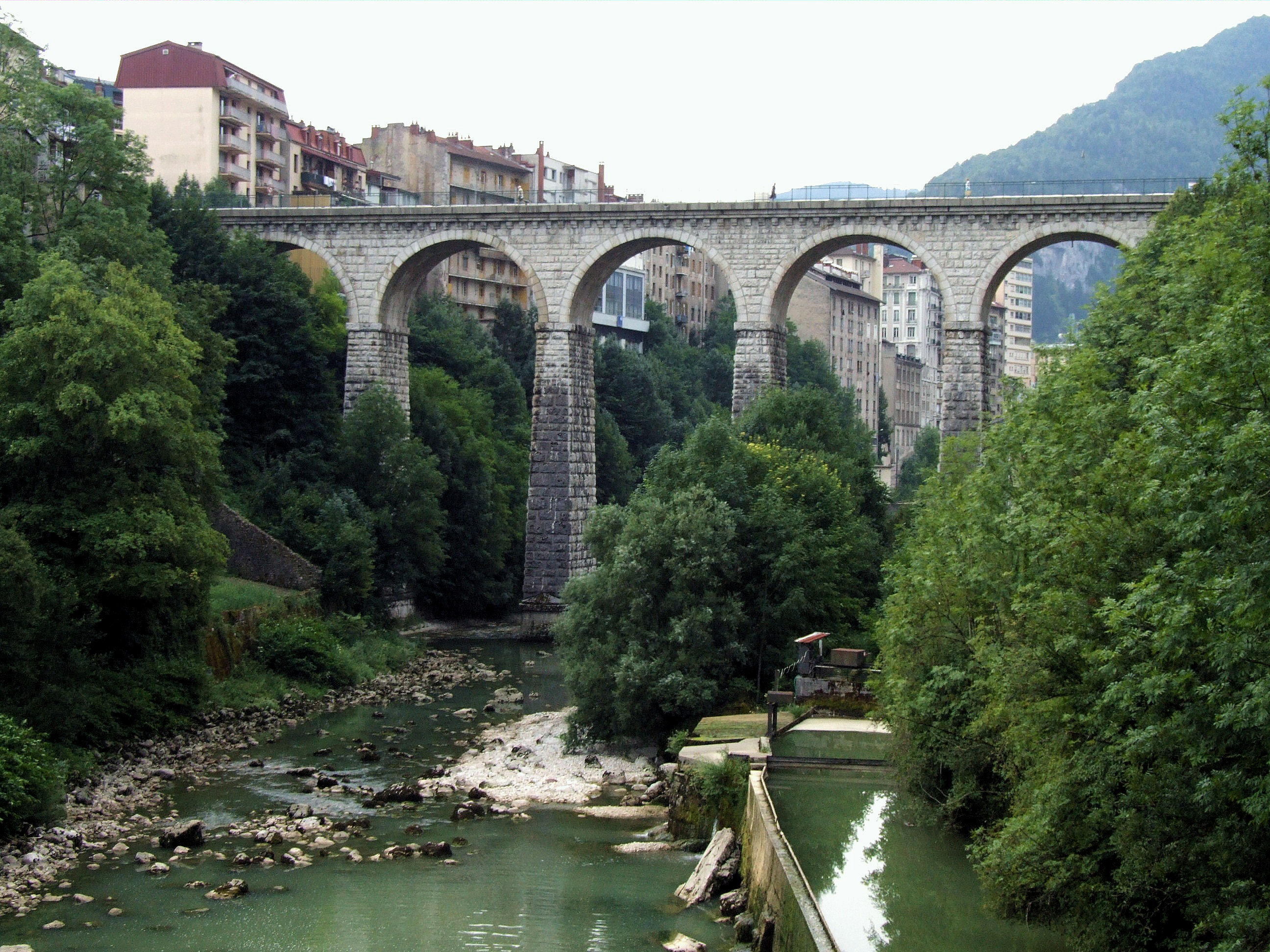
- The Bienne at Saint-Claude

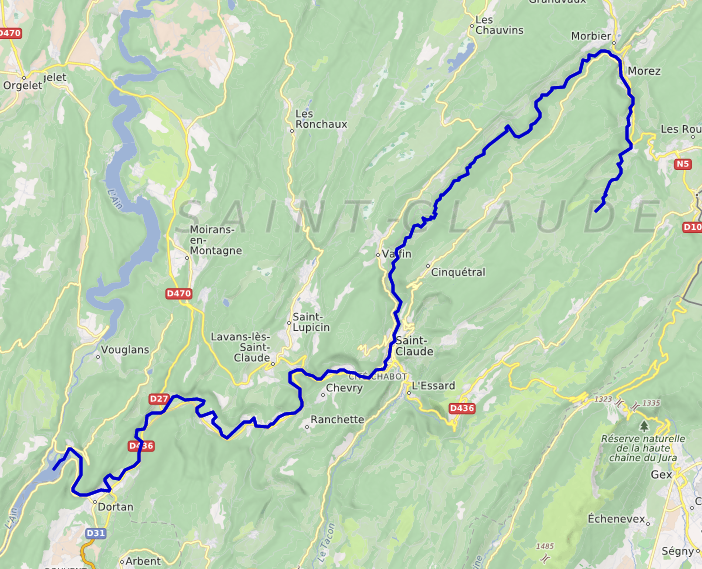

Location
- Country: France

Physical characteristics
- Mouth
  - location: Ain
  - coordinates: 46°19′58″N 5°38′14″E
- Length: 68.8 km (42.8 mi)

Basin features
- Progression: Ain→ Rhône→ Mediterranean Sea

The Bienne (French pronunciation: [bjɛn]) is a 68.8 km (42.8 mi) long river in the Jura and Ain departments of eastern France. Its source is near Prémanon, Jura. It passes through the towns Morez and Saint-Claude. It discharges into the reservoir Lac de Coiselet, which is drained by the Ain, near Dortan.
