= Germagnat =

Part of Nivigne et Suran in Auvergne-Rhône-Alpes, France

- Part of Nivigne et Suran
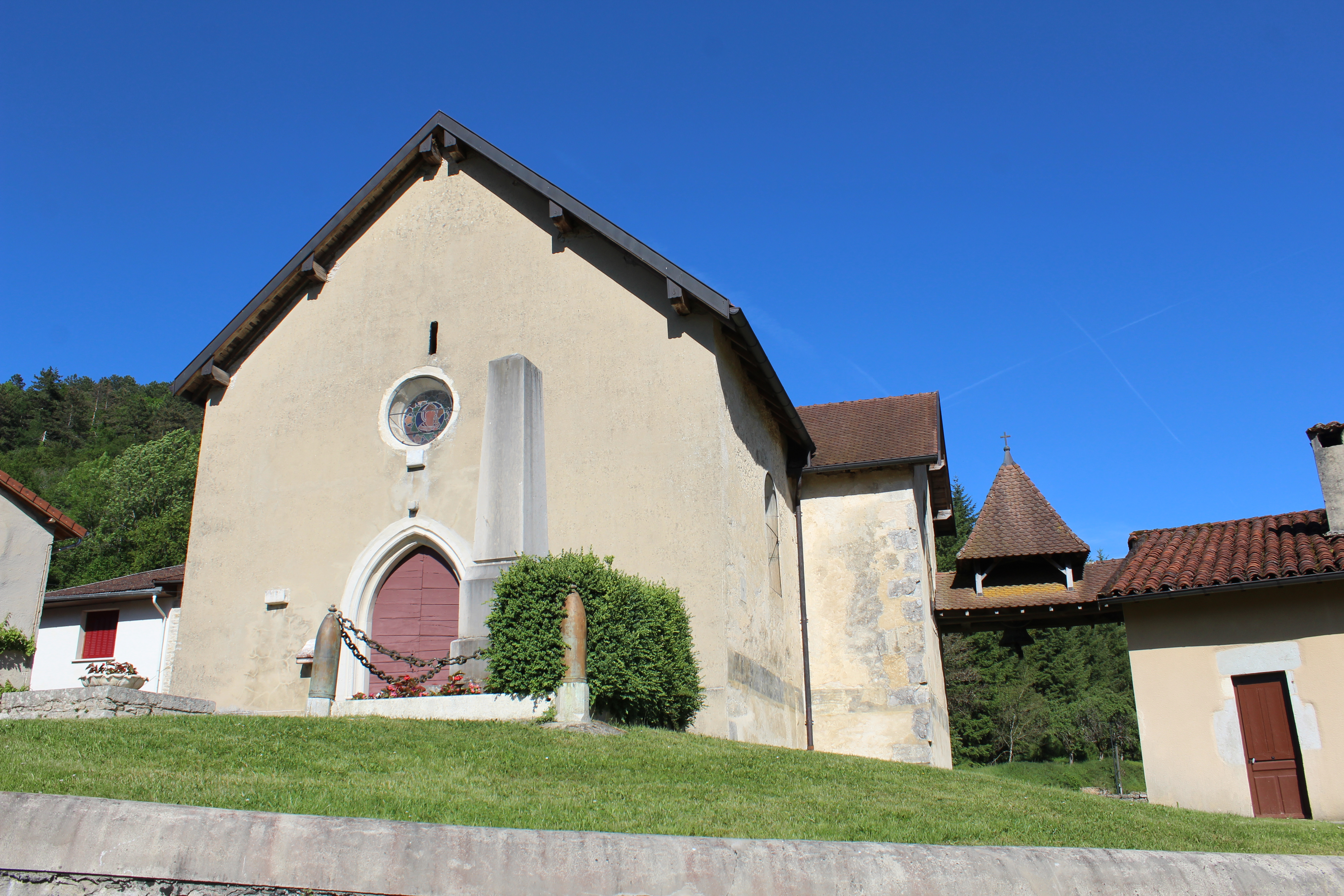
- Église St Germain Germagnat Nivigne Suran
- Location of Germagnat
- Location within France Location within Auvergne-Rhône-Alpes
- Coordinates: 46°18′41″N 5°26′57″E
- Country: France
- Region: Auvergne-Rhône-Alpes
- Department: Ain
- Arrondissement: Bourg-en-Bresse
- Canton: Saint-Étienne-du-Bois
- Commune: Nivigne et Suran
- Area^{1}: 9.48 km^{2} (3.66 sq mi)
- Elevation: 344 m (1,129 ft)
- Highest elevation: 761 m (2,497 ft)
- Lowest elevation: 319 m (1,047 ft)
- Population (2019): 152
  - Density: 16.0/km^{2} (41.5/sq mi)
- Time zone: UTC+01:00 (CET)
  - Summer (DST): UTC+02:00 (CEST)
- Postal code: 01250
- ^{1} French Land Register data, which excludes lakes, ponds, glaciers > 1 km^{2} (0.386 sq mi or 247 acres) and river estuaries.

Germagnat (French pronunciation: [ʒɛʁmaɲa]) is a former commune in the Ain department in eastern France. On 1 January 2017, it was merged into the new commune Nivigne et Suran.

== Population ==
Historical population
Year	Pop.	±% p.a.
2006	133	—
2011	146	+1.88%
2019	152	+0.50%
Source: INSEE

== See also ==
- Communes of the Ain department
