= Drom =

Commune in Auvergne-Rhône-Alpes, France

- Commune
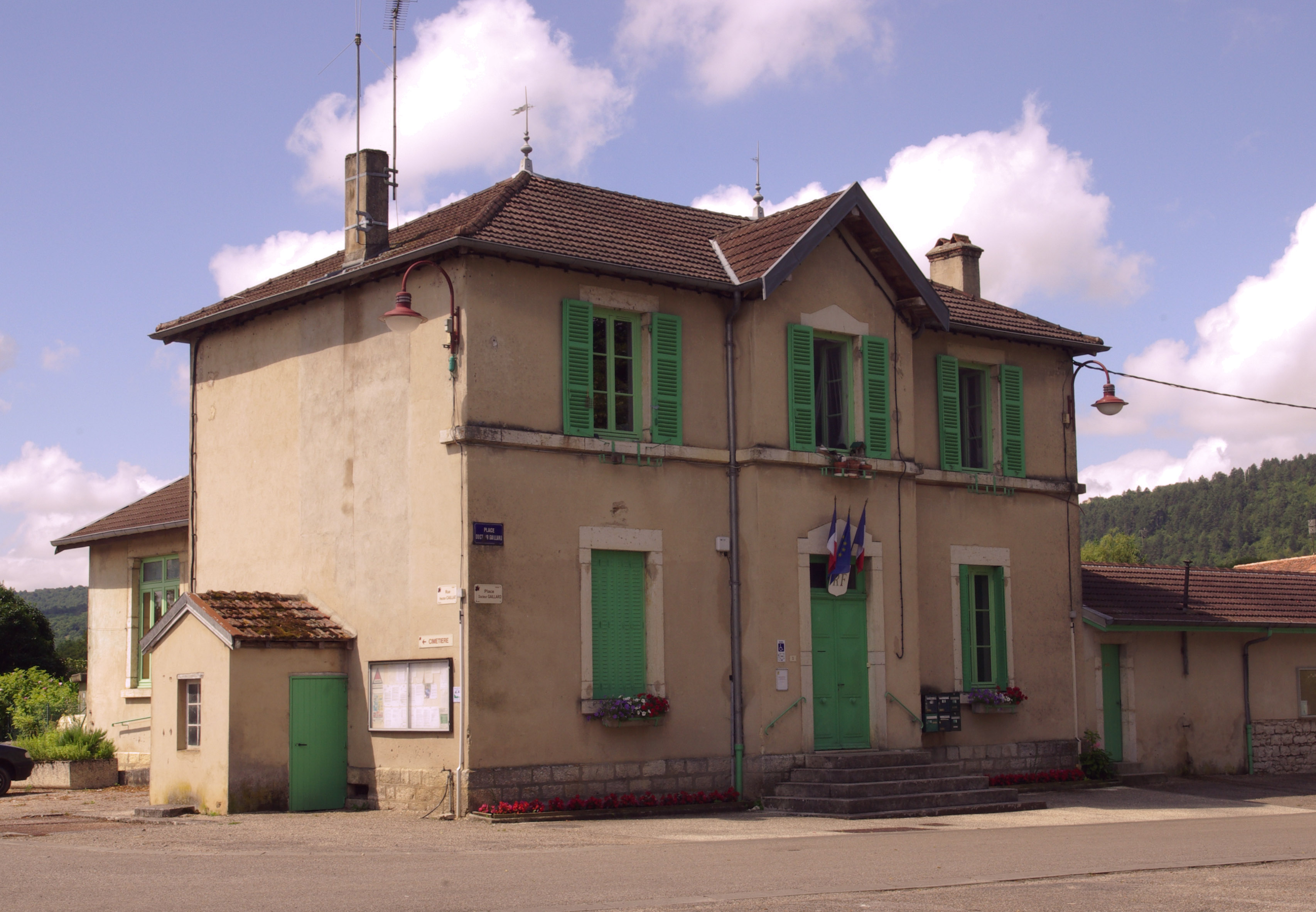
- Town hall
- Location of Drom
- Location within France Location within Auvergne-Rhône-Alpes
- Coordinates: 46°13′00″N 5°22′00″E
- Country: France
- Region: Auvergne-Rhône-Alpes
- Department: Ain
- Arrondissement: Bourg-en-Bresse
- Canton: Saint-Étienne-du-Bois
- Intercommunality: CA Bassin de Bourg-en-Bresse

Government
  - Mayor (2026–32): Yvan Hertrich
- Area^{1}: 7.78 km^{2} (3.00 sq mi)
- Elevation: 320 m (1,050 ft)
- Highest elevation: 505 m (1,657 ft)
- Lowest elevation: 310 m (1,020 ft)
- Population (2023): 215
  - Density: 27.6/km^{2} (71.6/sq mi)
- Time zone: UTC+01:00 (CET)
  - Summer (DST): UTC+02:00 (CEST)
- INSEE/Postal code: 01150 /01250
- ^{1} French Land Register data, which excludes lakes, ponds, glaciers > 1 km^{2} (0.386 sq mi or 247 acres) and river estuaries.

Drom is a commune in the Ain department in eastern France.

== Population ==
Historical population
| Year | Pop. | ±% p.a. |
|---|---|---|
| 1968 | 146 | — |
| 1975 | 153 | +0.67% |
| 1982 | 139 | −1.36% |
| 1990 | 146 | +0.62% |
| 1999 | 160 | +1.02% |
| 2007 | 179 | +1.41% |
| 2012 | 214 | +3.64% |
| 2017 | 216 | +0.19% |
| 2023 | 215 | −0.08% |
Source: INSEE

== See also ==
- Communes of the Ain department
