= Villereversure =

Commune in Auvergne-Rhône-Alpes, France

- Commune
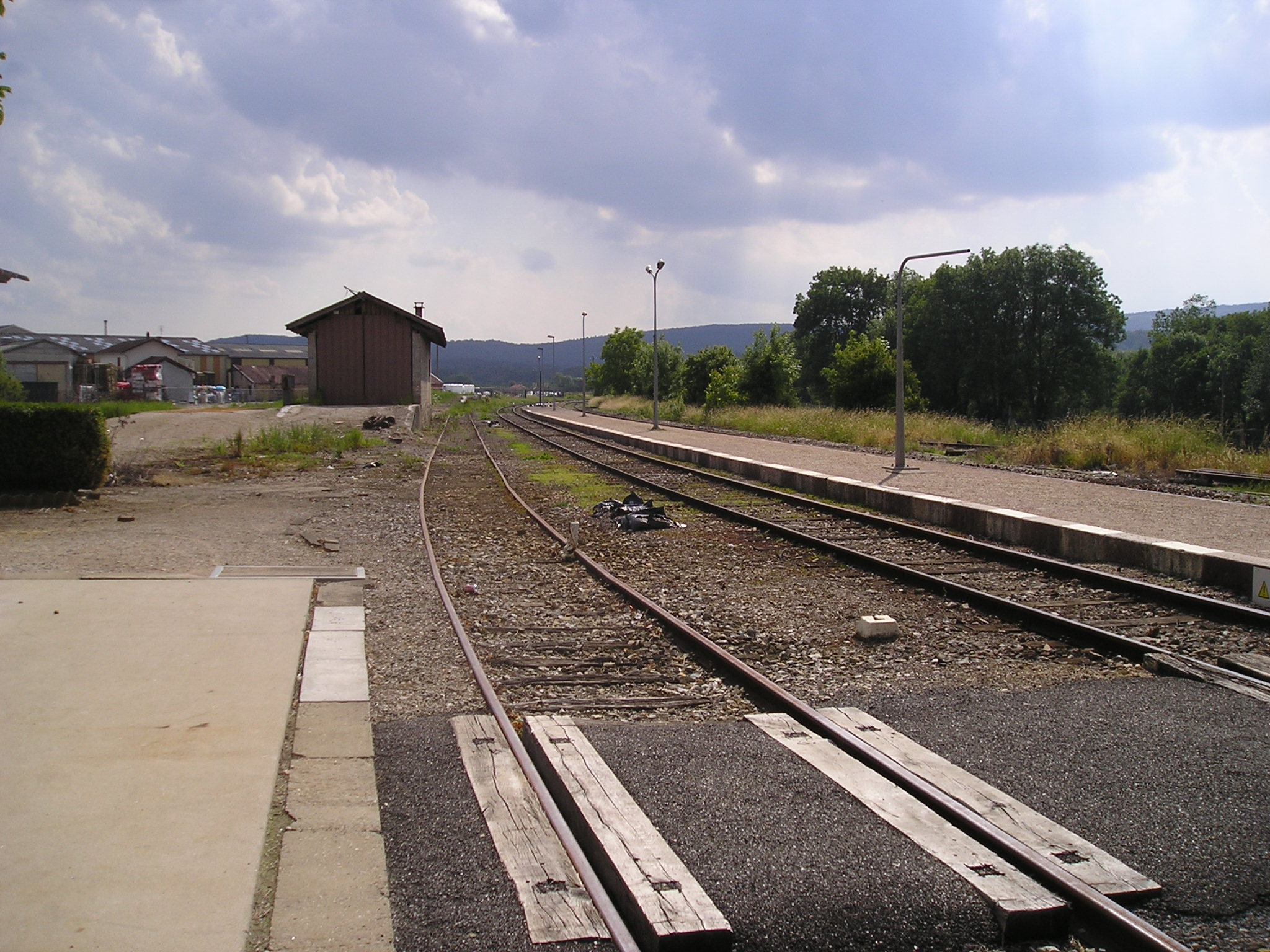
- Train station

- Coat of arms
- Location of Villereversure
- Location within France Location within Auvergne-Rhône-Alpes
- Coordinates: 46°11′31″N 5°23′53″E
- Country: France
- Region: Auvergne-Rhône-Alpes
- Department: Ain
- Arrondissement: Bourg-en-Bresse
- Canton: Saint-Étienne-du-Bois
- Intercommunality: CA Bassin de Bourg-en-Bresse

Government
  - Mayor (2026–32): Jordan Girerd
- Area^{1}: 17.45 km^{2} (6.74 sq mi)
- Elevation: 284 m (932 ft)
- Highest elevation: 480 m (1,570 ft)
- Lowest elevation: 279 m (915 ft)
- Population (2023): 1,420
  - Density: 81.4/km^{2} (211/sq mi)
- Time zone: UTC+01:00 (CET)
  - Summer (DST): UTC+02:00 (CEST)
- INSEE/Postal code: 01447 /01250
- ^{1} French Land Register data, which excludes lakes, ponds, glaciers > 1 km^{2} (0.386 sq mi or 247 acres) and river estuaries.

Villereversure (French pronunciation: [vilʁəvɛʁsyʁ]) is a commune in the Ain department in eastern France.

== Population ==
Historical population
Year	Pop.	±% p.a.
1968	949	—
1975	933	−0.24%
1982	1,002	+1.02%
1990	1,003	+0.01%
1999	1,102	+1.05%
2007	1,195	+1.02%
2012	1,212	+0.28%
2017	1,291	+1.27%
2023	1,420	+1.60%
Source: INSEE

== See also ==
- Communes of the Ain department
