= Grand-Corent =

Commune in Auvergne-Rhône-Alpes, France

- Commune
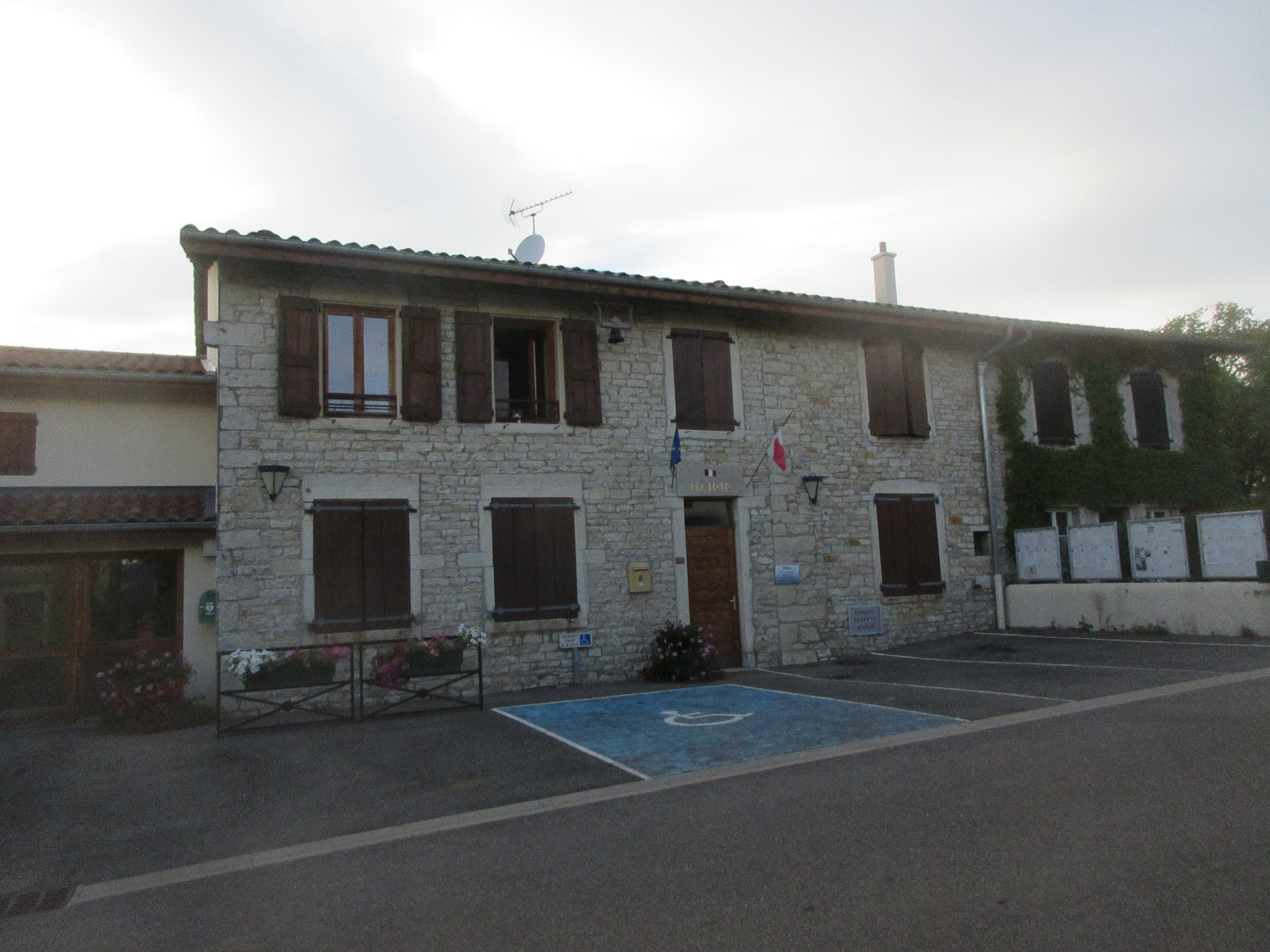
- Town hall

- Coat of arms
- Location of Grand-Corent
- Location within France Location within Auvergne-Rhône-Alpes
- Coordinates: 46°12′00″N 5°26′00″E
- Country: France
- Region: Auvergne-Rhône-Alpes
- Department: Ain
- Arrondissement: Bourg-en-Bresse
- Canton: Saint-Étienne-du-Bois
- Intercommunality: CA Bassin de Bourg-en-Bresse

Government
  - Mayor (2026–32): Benjamin Raquin
- Area^{1}: 7.13 km^{2} (2.75 sq mi)
- Elevation: 500 m (1,600 ft)
- Highest elevation: 682 m (2,238 ft)
- Lowest elevation: 400 m (1,300 ft)
- Population (2023): 183
  - Density: 25.7/km^{2} (66.5/sq mi)
- Time zone: UTC+01:00 (CET)
  - Summer (DST): UTC+02:00 (CEST)
- INSEE/Postal code: 01177 /01250
- ^{1} French Land Register data, which excludes lakes, ponds, glaciers > 1 km^{2} (0.386 sq mi or 247 acres) and river estuaries.

Grand-Corent (French pronunciation: [ɡʁɑ̃ kɔʁɑ̃]) is a commune in the Ain department in eastern France.

== Population ==
Historical population
Year	Pop.	±% p.a.
1968	79	—
1975	60	−3.85%
1982	76	+3.43%
1990	104	+4.00%
1999	111	+0.73%
2007	135	+2.48%
2012	170	+4.72%
2017	177	+0.81%
2023	183	+0.56%
Source: INSEE

== See also ==
- Communes of the Ain department
