= Ramasse =

Commune in Auvergne-Rhône-Alpes, France

- Commune
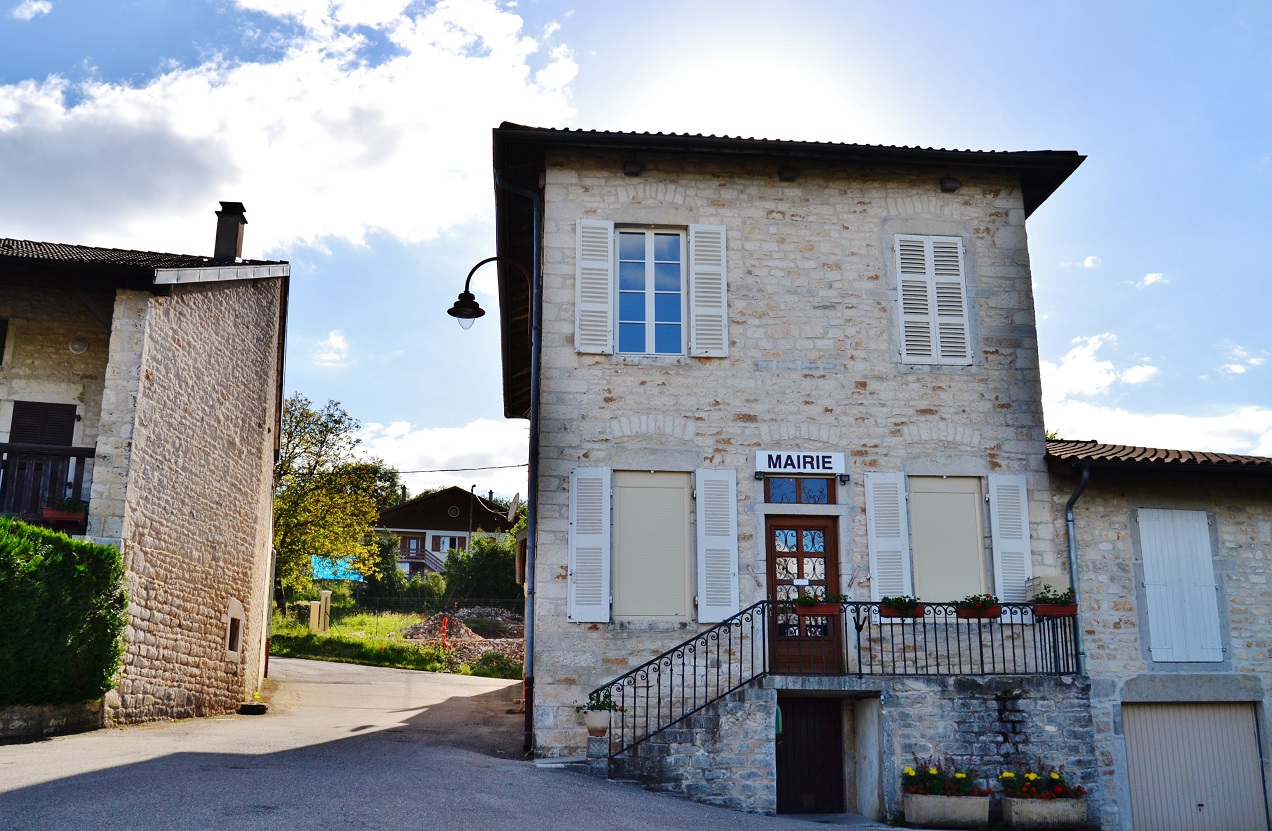
- Town hall
- Location of Ramasse
- Location within France Location within Auvergne-Rhône-Alpes
- Coordinates: 46°11′42″N 5°21′19″E
- Country: France
- Region: Auvergne-Rhône-Alpes
- Department: Ain
- Arrondissement: Bourg-en-Bresse
- Canton: Saint-Étienne-du-Bois
- Intercommunality: Bassin de Bourg-en-Bresse

Government
  - Mayor (2026–32): Christian Passaquet
- Area^{1}: 9.86 km^{2} (3.81 sq mi)
- Elevation: 338 m (1,109 ft)
- Highest elevation: 590 m (1,940 ft)
- Lowest elevation: 310 m (1,020 ft)
- Population (2023): 336
  - Density: 34.1/km^{2} (88.3/sq mi)
- Time zone: UTC+01:00 (CET)
  - Summer (DST): UTC+02:00 (CEST)
- INSEE/Postal code: 01317 /01250
- ^{1} French Land Register data, which excludes lakes, ponds, glaciers > 1 km^{2} (0.386 sq mi or 247 acres) and river estuaries.

Ramasse (French pronunciation: [ʁamas]) is a commune in the Ain department in eastern France.

== Population ==
Historical population
Year	Pop.	±% p.a.
1968	171	—
1975	156	−1.30%
1982	163	+0.63%
1990	189	+1.87%
1999	219	+1.65%
2007	259	+2.12%
2012	271	+0.91%
2017	324	+3.64%
2023	336	+0.61%
Source: INSEE

== See also ==
- Communes of the Ain department
