= Pressiat =

Part of Val-Revermont in Auvergne-Rhône-Alpes, France

- Part of Val-Revermont
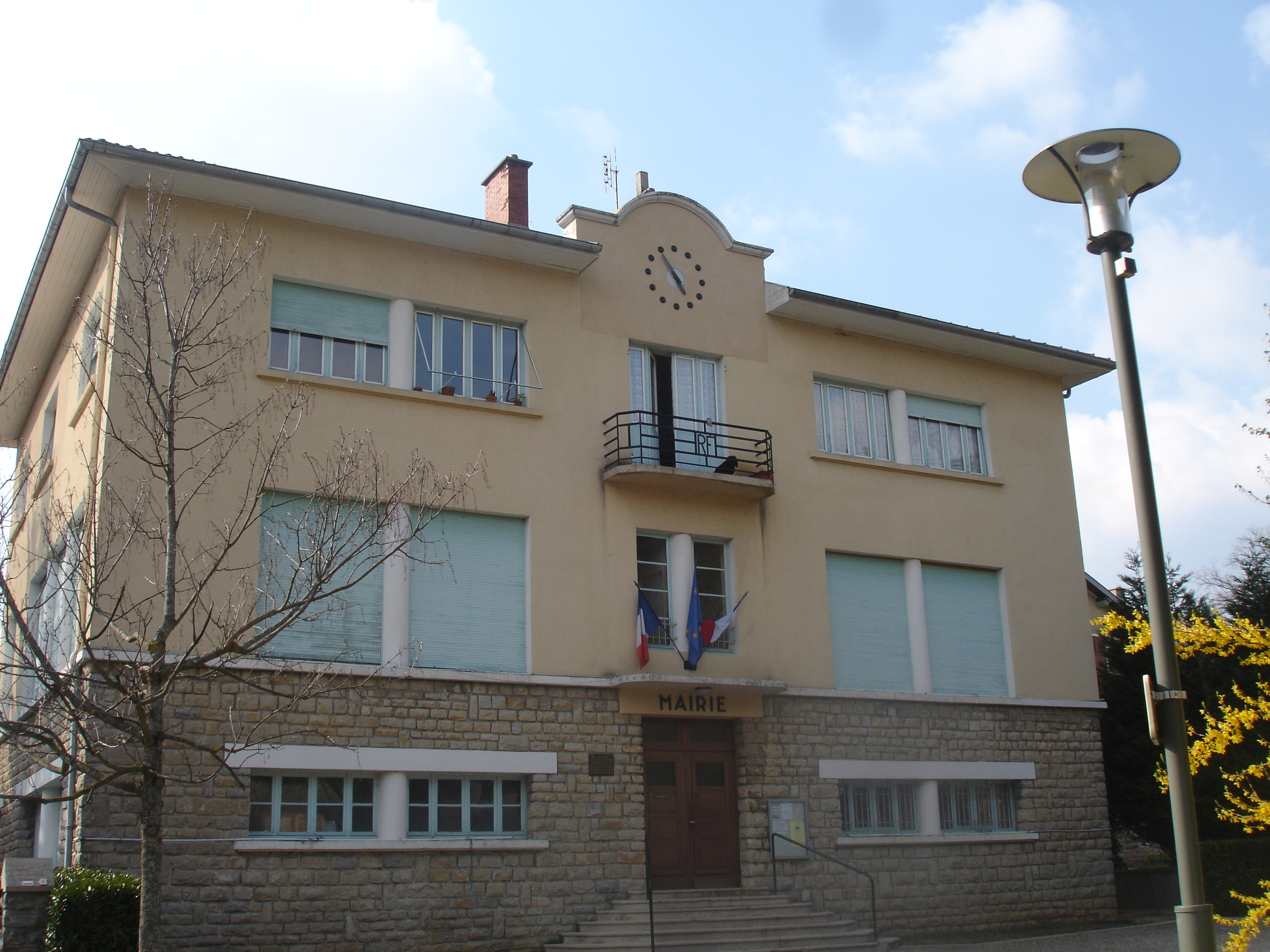
- Town hall

- Coat of arms
- Location of Pressiat
- Location within France Location within Auvergne-Rhône-Alpes
- Coordinates: 46°19′27″N 5°23′10″E
- Country: France
- Region: Auvergne-Rhône-Alpes
- Department: Ain
- Arrondissement: Bourg-en-Bresse
- Canton: Saint-Étienne-du-Bois
- Commune: Val-Revermont
- Area^{1}: 6.01 km^{2} (2.32 sq mi)
- Elevation: 360 m (1,180 ft)
- Highest elevation: 660 m (2,170 ft)
- Lowest elevation: 235 m (771 ft)
- Population (2022): 255
  - Density: 42.4/km^{2} (110/sq mi)
- Time zone: UTC+01:00 (CET)
  - Summer (DST): UTC+02:00 (CEST)
- Postal code: 01370
- ^{1} French Land Register data, which excludes lakes, ponds, glaciers > 1 km^{2} (0.386 sq mi or 247 acres) and river estuaries.

Pressiat (French pronunciation: [pʁesja]; Arpitan: Prèssiê) is a former commune in the Ain department in eastern France. On 1 January 2016, it was merged into the new commune Val-Revermont.

== Population ==
Historical population
| Year | Pop. | ±% p.a. |
|---|---|---|
| 2006 | 199 | — |
| 2011 | 230 | +2.94% |
| 2022 | 255 | +0.94% |
Source: INSEE

== See also ==
- Communes of the Ain department
