= Val-Revermont =

Commune in Auvergne-Rhône-Alpes, France

- Commune
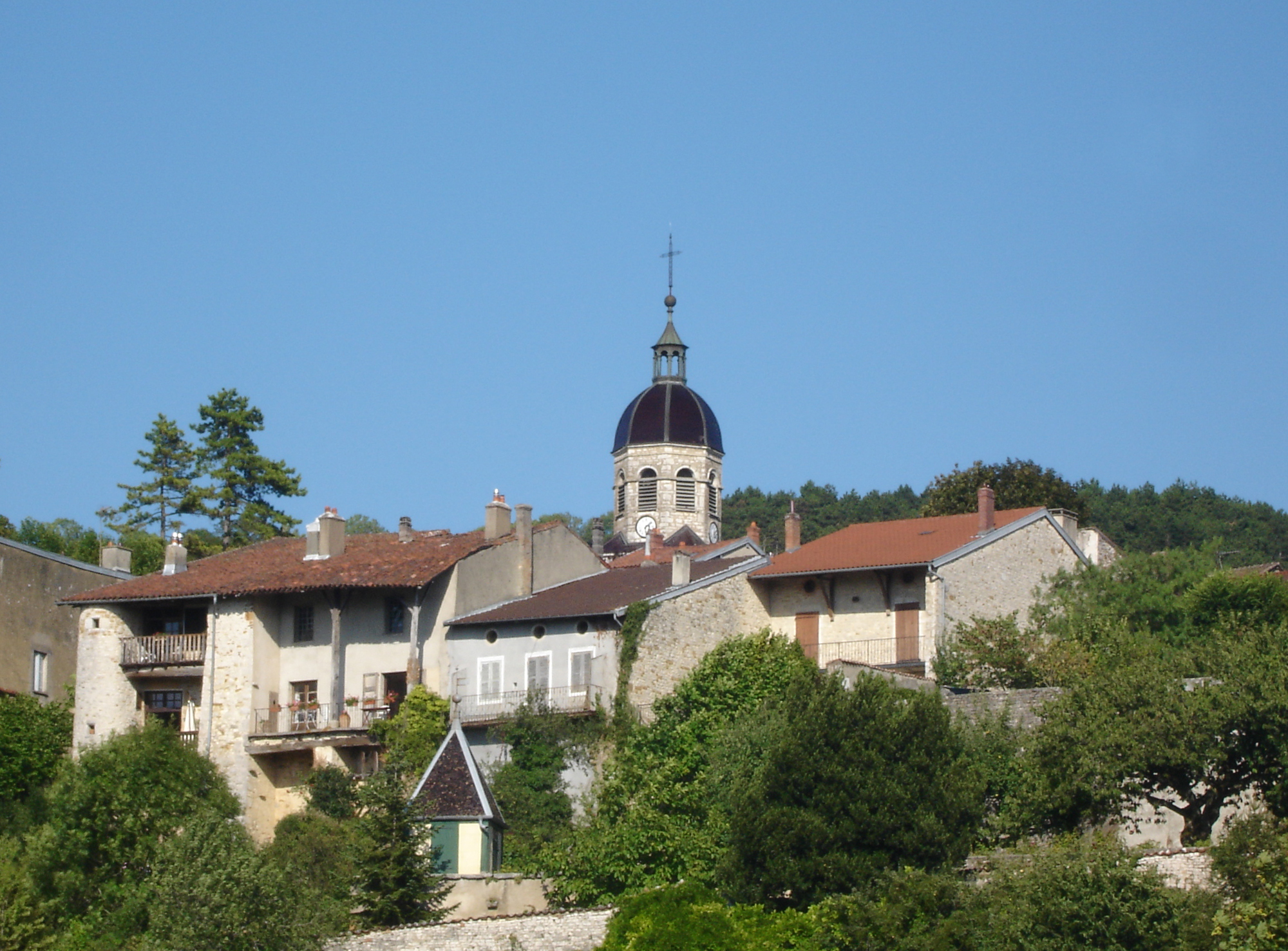
- Location of Val-Revermont
- Location within France Location within Auvergne-Rhône-Alpes
- Coordinates: 46°16′16″N 5°22′08″E
- Country: France
- Region: Auvergne-Rhône-Alpes
- Department: Ain
- Arrondissement: Bourg-en-Bresse
- Canton: Saint-Étienne-du-Bois
- Intercommunality: Bassin de Bourg-en-Bresse

Government
  - Mayor (2026–32): Olivier Joly
- Area^{1}: 45.42 km^{2} (17.54 sq mi)
- Population (2023): 2,488
  - Density: 54.78/km^{2} (141.9/sq mi)
- Time zone: UTC+01:00 (CET)
  - Summer (DST): UTC+02:00 (CEST)
- INSEE/Postal code: 01426 /01370
- ^{1} French Land Register data, which excludes lakes, ponds, glaciers > 1 km^{2} (0.386 sq mi or 247 acres) and river estuaries.

Val-Revermont is a commune in the Ain department of eastern France. The municipality was established on 1 January 2016 and consists of the former communes of Treffort-Cuisiat and Pressiat.

== Population ==
Population data refer to the commune in its geography as of January 2025.

Historical population
Year	Pop.	±% p.a.
1968	1,330	—
1975	1,228	−1.13%
1982	1,704	+4.79%
1990	1,934	+1.60%
1999	2,101	+0.92%
2007	2,210	+0.63%
2012	2,499	+2.49%
2017	2,601	+0.80%
2023	2,488	−0.74%
Source: INSEE

== See also ==
- Communes of the Ain department
