= Treffort-Cuisiat =

Part of Val-Revermont in Auvergne-Rhône-Alpes, France

- Part of Val-Revermont
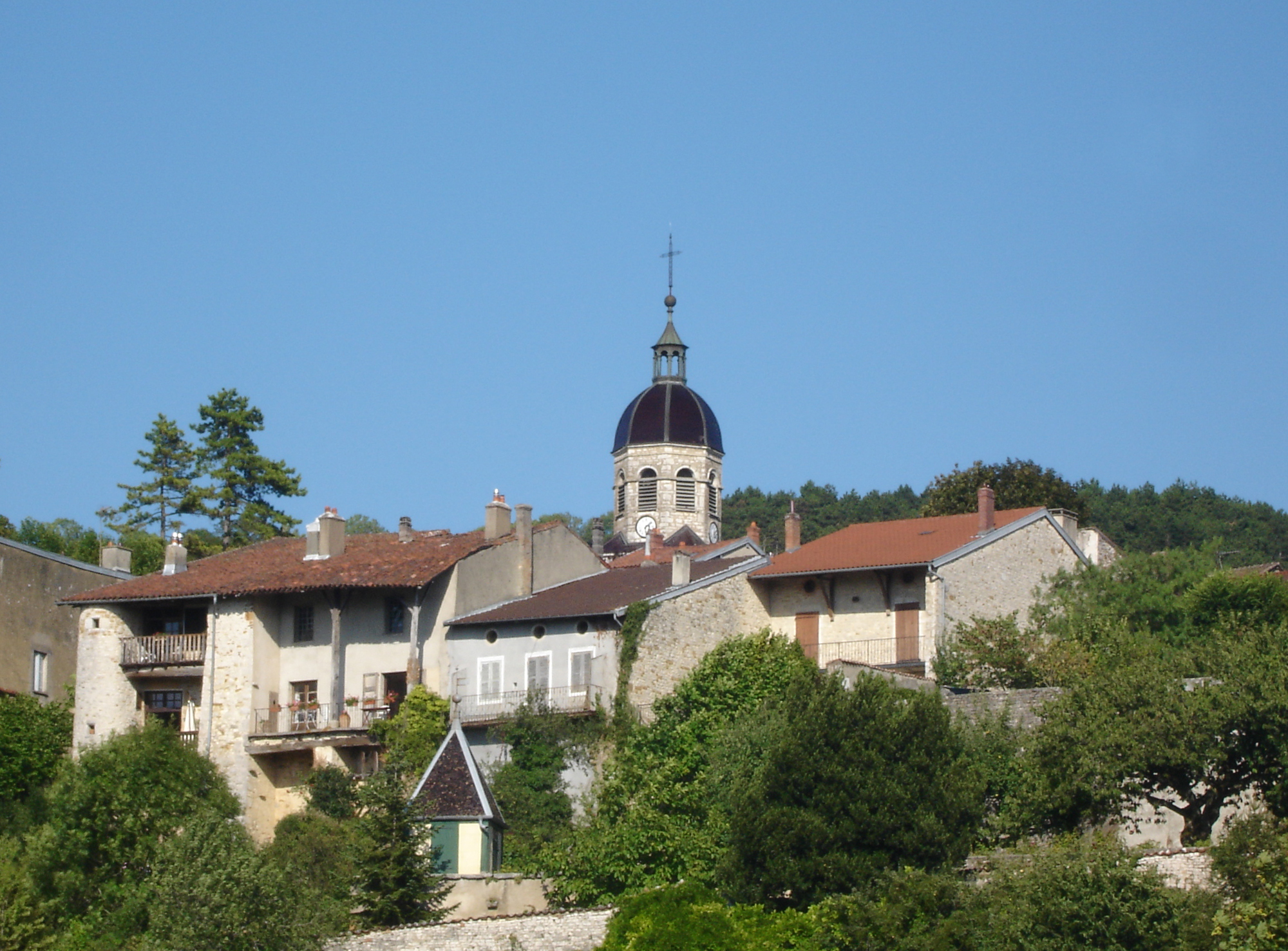

- Coat of arms
- Location of Treffort-Cuisiat
- Location within France Location within Auvergne-Rhône-Alpes
- Coordinates: 46°16′20″N 5°22′09″E
- Country: France
- Region: Auvergne-Rhône-Alpes
- Department: Ain
- Arrondissement: Bourg-en-Bresse
- Canton: Saint-Étienne-du-Bois
- Commune: Val-Revermont
- Area^{1}: 39.41 km^{2} (15.22 sq mi)
- Highest elevation: 681 m (2,234 ft)
- Lowest elevation: 221 m (725 ft)
- Population (2016): 2,335
  - Density: 59.25/km^{2} (153.5/sq mi)
- Time zone: UTC+01:00 (CET)
  - Summer (DST): UTC+02:00 (CEST)
- Postal code: 01370
- ^{1} French Land Register data, which excludes lakes, ponds, glaciers > 1 km^{2} (0.386 sq mi or 247 acres) and river estuaries.

Treffort-Cuisiat (French pronunciation: [tʁefɔʁ kɥizja]) is a former commune in the Ain department in eastern France. It was created in 1972 by the merger of two former communes: Treffort and Cuisiat. On 1 January 2016, it was merged into the new commune Val-Revermont.

== Geography ==
The Sevron formed most of the commune's southwestern border.

== Population ==
Historical population
Year	Pop.	±% p.a.
1975	1,101	—
1982	1,556	+5.07%
1990	1,779	+1.69%
1999	1,910	+0.79%
2006	2,011	+0.74%
2016	2,335	+1.51%
Source: EHESS and INSEE

== Culture ==
Cuisiat is home to the Revermont museum in the old school house.

== See also ==
- Communes of the Ain department
