= Ain (river) =

River in eastern France

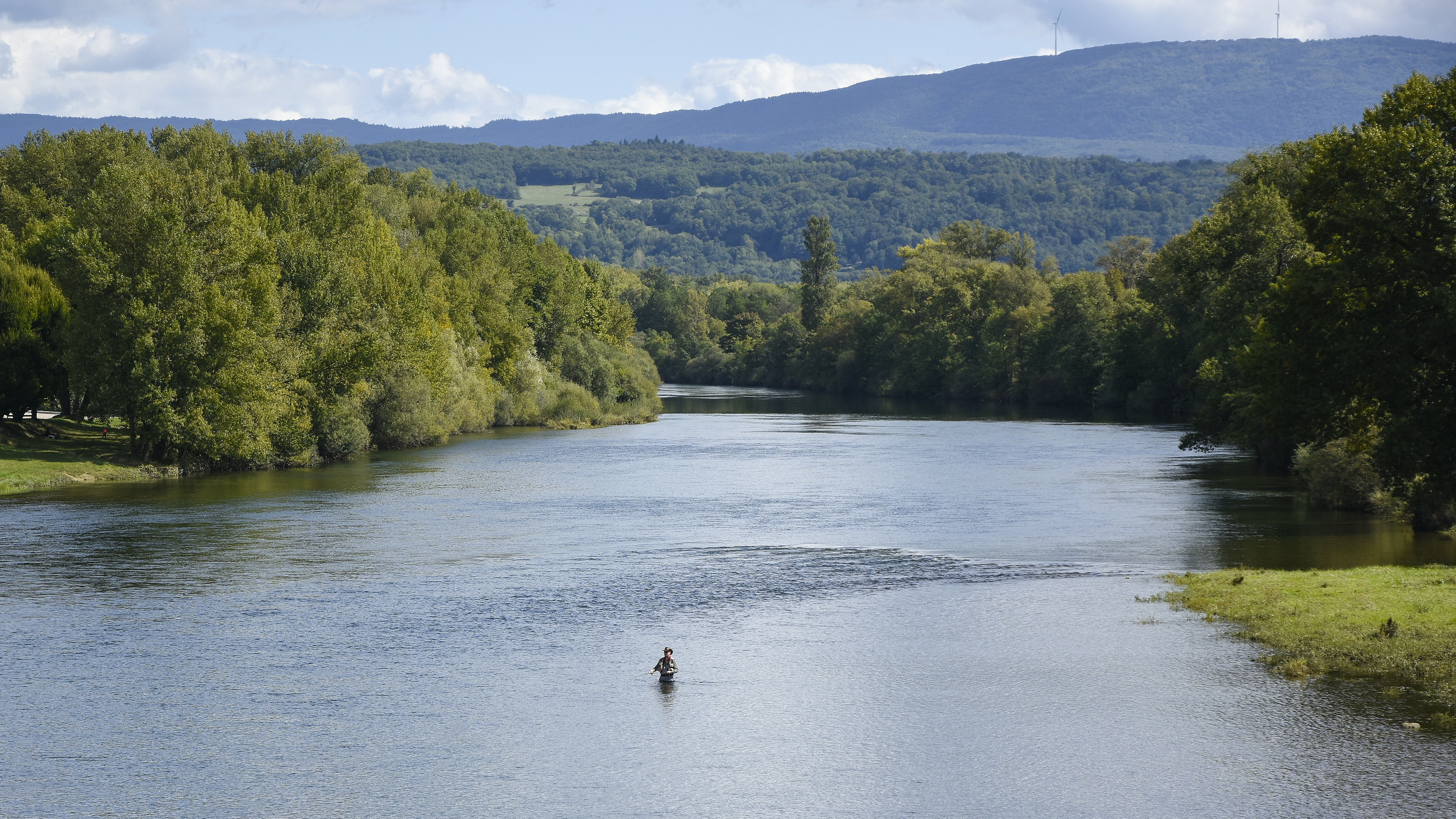

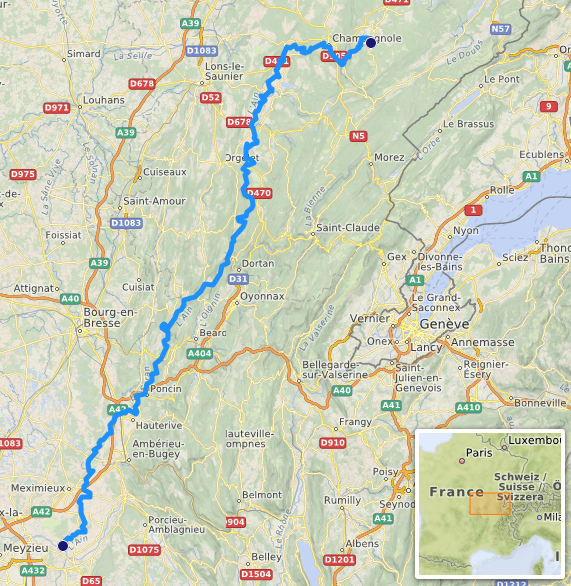
- Native name: En (Arpitan)

Location
- Country: France

Physical characteristics
- Source
  - location: Jura Mountains
  - coordinates: 46°44′58″N 6°1′24″E
  - elevation: ± 700 m (2,300 ft)
- Mouth
  - location: Rhône
  - coordinates: 45°47′45″N 5°10′10″E
- Length: 190 km (120 mi)
- Basin size: 3,630 km^{2} (1,400 sq mi)
- Discharge
  - average: 130 m^{3}/s (4,600 cu ft/s)

Basin features
- Progression: Rhône→ Mediterranean Sea

The Ain (/æ̃/, French: [ɛ̃]; Arpitan: En) is a river in eastern France. It gave its name to the Ain department. It is 190 km (120 mi) long.

== Geography ==
The river rises at an altitude of some 700 metres, near the village of La Favière, in the Jurassic limestone of the southern end of the Jura Mountains and flows into the Rhône near Saint-Maurice-de-Gourdans, about 40 kilometres upstream of Lyon.

Its source is in the old county of Franche-Comté. It flows south through the combined lengths of the two departments of:

- Jura (named after the mountains), and
- Ain (named after the river).

On the way it passes through the towns of Champagnole and Pont-d'Ain. Its longest tributaries are the Suran, Bienne, Albarine and Valouse.

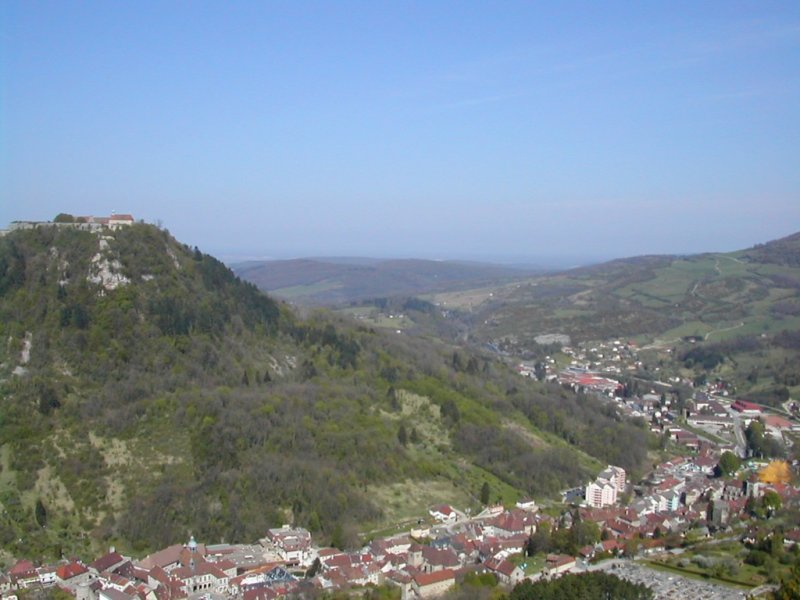
Salins-les-Bains in the glaciated landscape of the upper Ain.

== Geology ==
The river flows through two regions. The Jura Mountains are Jurassic but include less clay than the Jurassic of England. The lower river passes over Holocene deposits from the river's own activity among rocks of the Middle or Upper Pleistocene (CG).

The Jura consists of limestone strata crushed into ridges between the forces of the spreading rift valley of the Saône and the Alps, the latter raised by a collision of the Italian tectonic plate with Europe. The highest ridge is the easternmost and the Ain flows southwards in the lowest valley, which lies towards the western side of the Jura. The westernmost ridge is again rather higher as the plain of the Saône valley is subducted below the Jurassic rocks (Dercourt). The whole has been glaciated but there is relatively little till remaining in the Jura.

The lower Ain flows on the plain where there is much Pleistocene material, much of it glacial till. However, the low scarp between the Pays de Dombes and the river is Miocene (CG).

== Economy ==
The economy is not generally such as to provide riches. Neither is it one which used to require large towns as other than external markets in which to sell. The population is therefore dispersed. The exception to this is the town of Oyonnax, in the Ange valley which is parallel with the Ain. According to the legend, St Léger gave the monopoly of comb making to Oyonnax in 630. The traditional small products of the region, wood-turning, horn combs and trinkets led to the development of a specialism in the injection moulding, vacuum forming and so on of plastics, beginning with celluloid in 1880. The town's population in 1999 was 24,636 but it is the exception for the river basin (ext links).

Timber is the region's most obvious asset. Some was marketed down river and some converted into charcoal which permitted the rise of water-powered forges working iron from smelters in the Saône valley. There is also pasture producing cheese specialities. In the 20th century, the water power was diverted to the production of hydro-electricity, a fact which aided the early introduction of the plastics industry at Oyonnax. In this, the Ain is central.

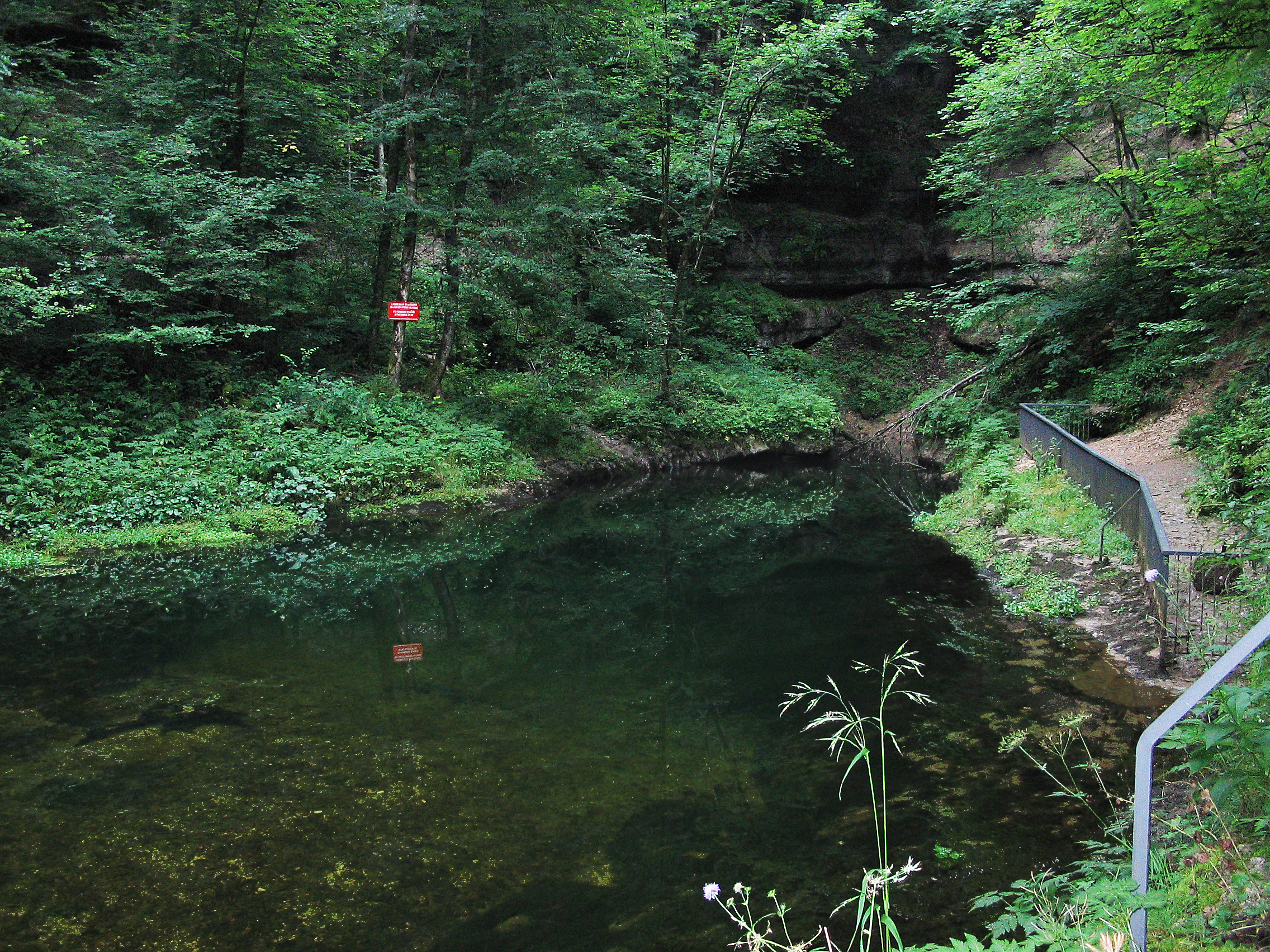
Source of the Ain

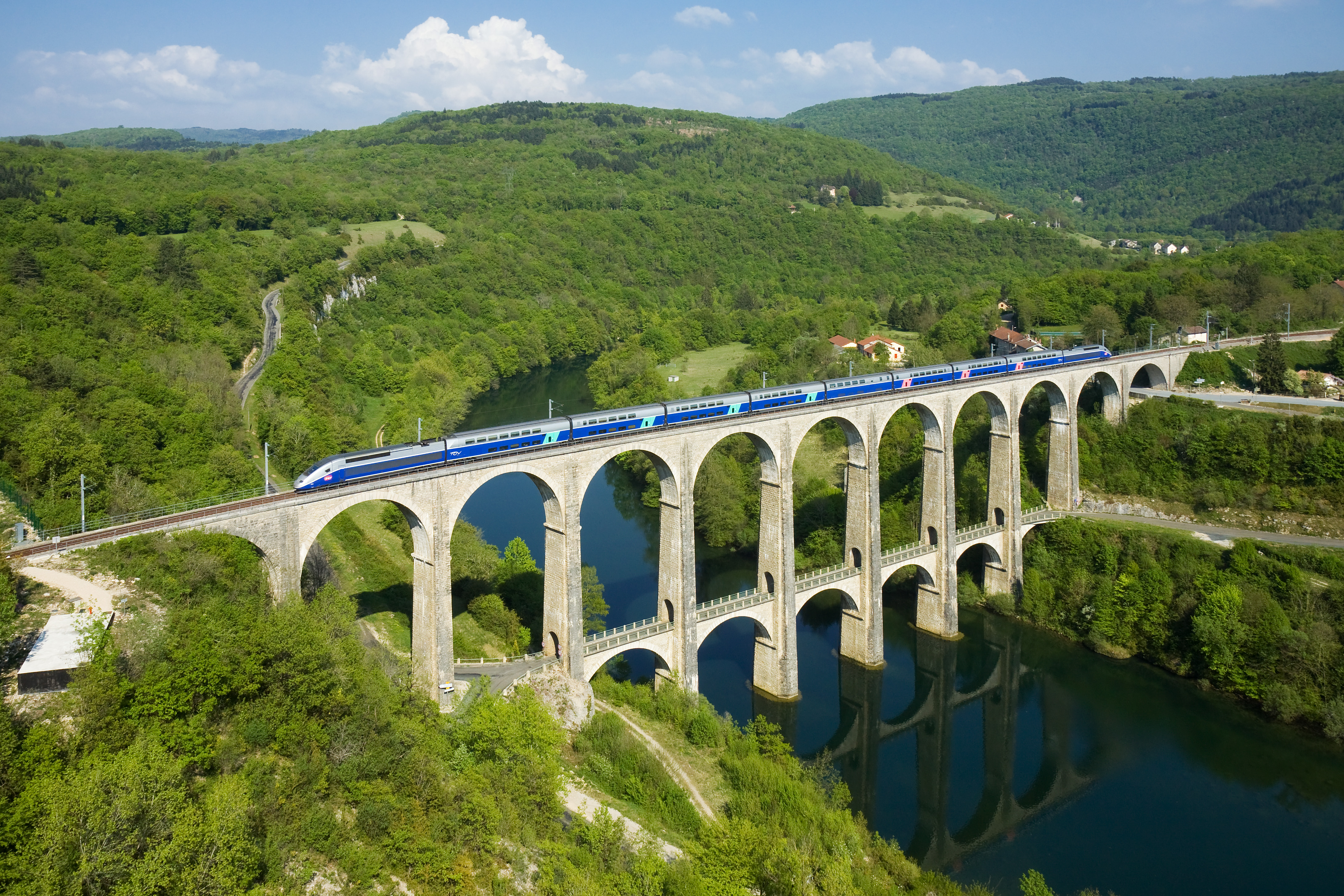
The Cize–Bolozon viaduct, a road–rail bridge crossing the Ain gorge.

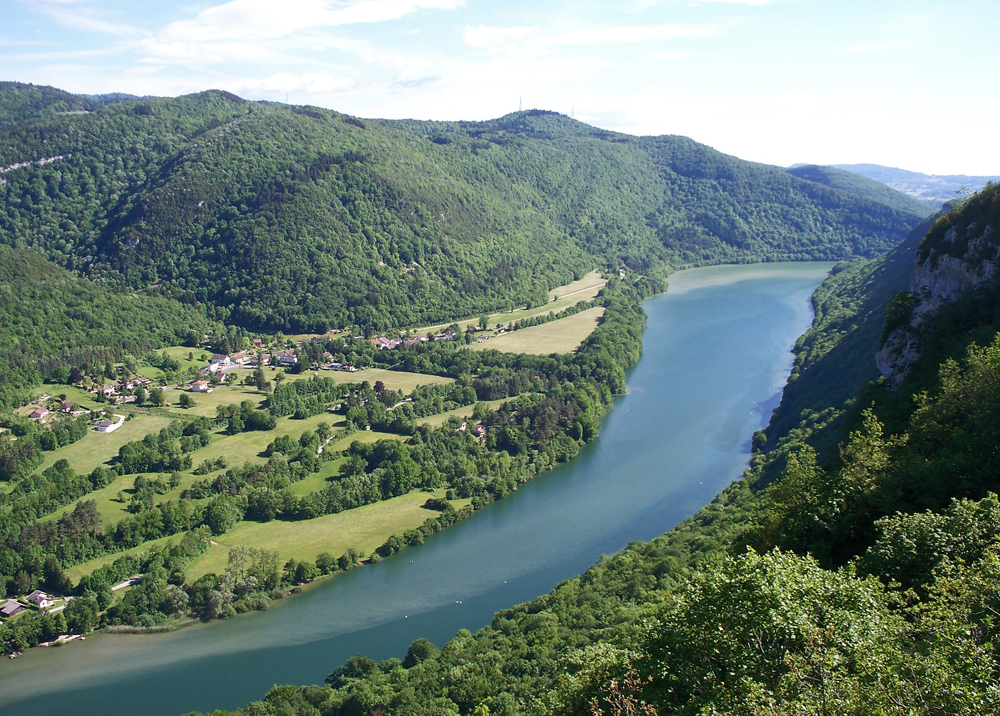
The Gorges de l'Ain at Corveissiat

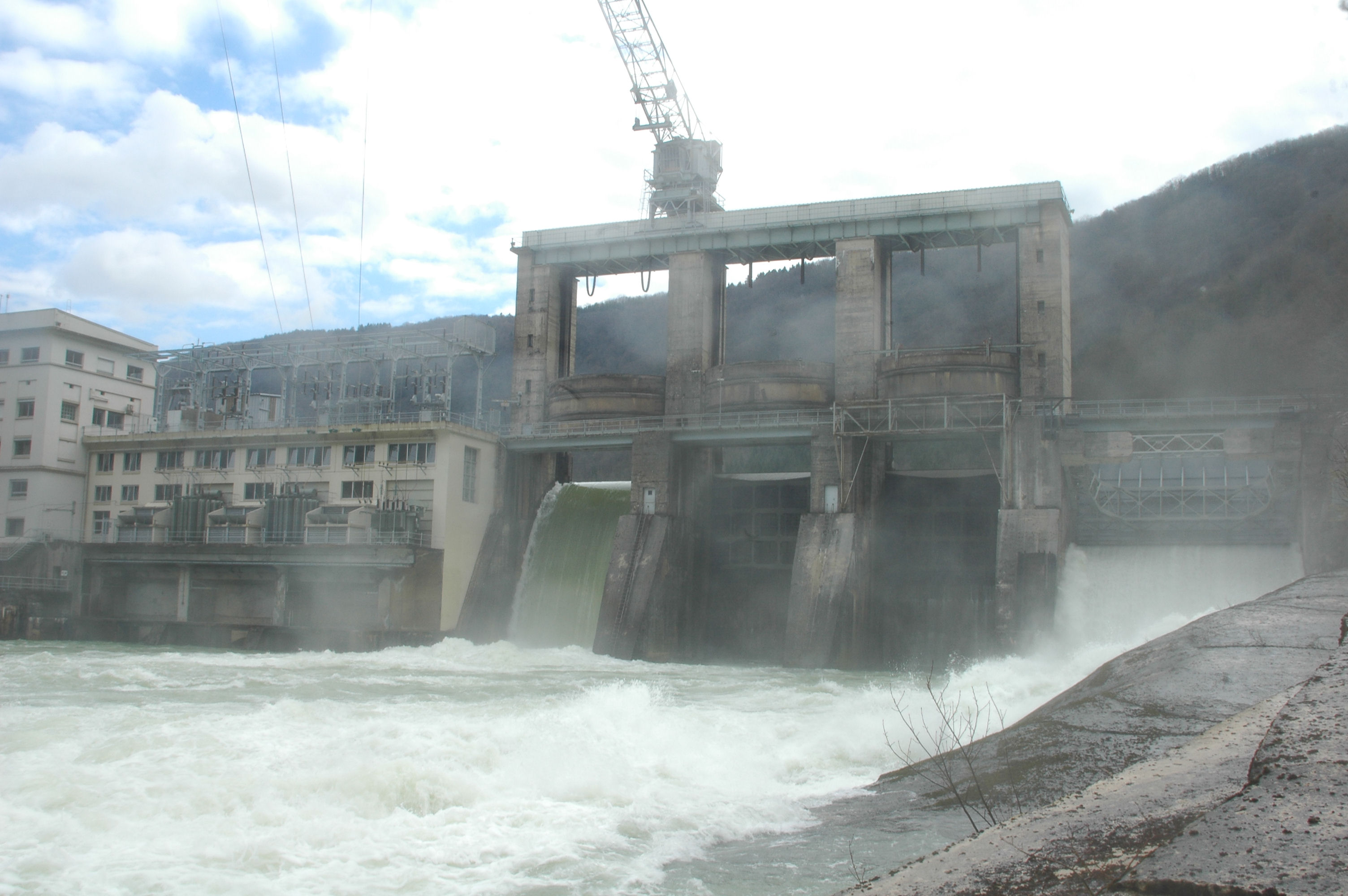
The dam (barrage) at Cize-Bolozon

== Fauna ==
The Ain is very rich in fish, including trout, in particular Salmo trutta fario; grayling, especially the common grayling Thymallys thymallus; pike, perch, barbel, bream, carp, tench, roach, Eurasian minnow, chub and loach.

Numerous birds populate the river's banks: duck, egret, swans, heron, and snipe. Beavers are also present and construct numerous dams while wild boar and roe deer are found in the woods and forests bordering the stream. Otters have once more been seen since 2003, so demonstrating a general improvement in the quality of the waters.

== Development ==
The river's natural surroundings remain relatively wild, and are the subject of an environmental scheme by the name of a SDAGE (Schéma Directeur d'Aménagement et de Gestion des Eaux), set up under a French law. Its aim is to conserve and make the best use of the whole hydrological system by viewing it as a unit. That involves reconciling the hydro-electric stations with the boating, fishing, swimming and perhaps water extraction in view of the tendency to industrial development on the reclaimed delta land at its confluence with the Rhone at its southern end.

== Statistics ==
Hydrological station	Area of basin (km^{2})	Mean annual flow rate (m^{3}/s)
Perte-de-l'Ain	210	9.590
Marigny	650	27.40
Barrage de Voulgans	1120	40.80
Pont-d'Ain	2760	105.0
Chazey-sur-Ain	3630	123.0

== See also ==
- Lac de Conflans, a lake at the confluence of the Ain and Valouse Rivers
- Saine (river)
