= Hautecourt-Romanèche =

Commune in Auvergne-Rhône-Alpes, France

- Commune
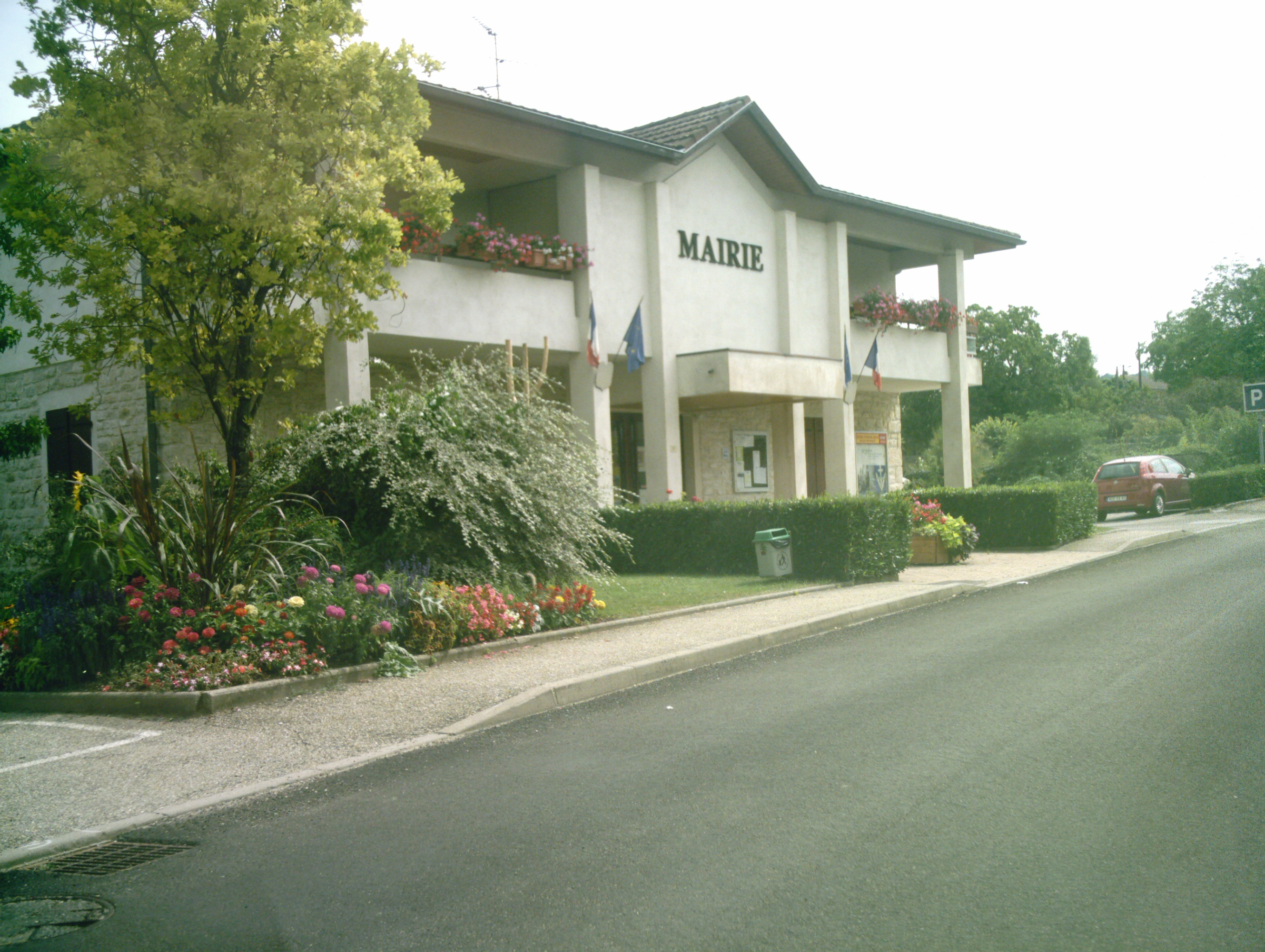
- Town hall
- Location of Hautecourt-Romanèche
- Location within France Location within Auvergne-Rhône-Alpes
- Coordinates: 46°09′35″N 5°25′03″E
- Country: France
- Region: Auvergne-Rhône-Alpes
- Department: Ain
- Arrondissement: Bourg-en-Bresse
- Canton: Saint-Étienne-du-Bois
- Intercommunality: CA Bassin de Bourg-en-Bresse

Government
  - Mayor (2026–32): Nathalie Givord
- Area^{1}: 21.60 km^{2} (8.34 sq mi)
- Elevation: 324 m (1,063 ft)
- Highest elevation: 548 m (1,798 ft)
- Lowest elevation: 260 m (850 ft)
- Population (2023): 748
  - Density: 34.6/km^{2} (89.7/sq mi)
- Time zone: UTC+01:00 (CET)
  - Summer (DST): UTC+02:00 (CEST)
- INSEE/Postal code: 01184 /01250
- ^{1} French Land Register data, which excludes lakes, ponds, glaciers > 1 km^{2} (0.386 sq mi or 247 acres) and river estuaries.

Hautecourt-Romanèche (French pronunciation: [otkuʁ ʁɔmanɛʃ]) is a commune in the Ain department in eastern France. It was created in 1973 by the merger of two former communes: Hautecourt and Romanèche.

The commune comprises many villages and hamlets including: Challes, Chambod, Hautecourt, Merlot, Perroi, Romaneche, Soiriat and Villette.

== Population ==
Historical population
Year	Pop.	±% p.a.
1968	446	—
1975	456	+0.32%
1982	549	+2.69%
1990	588	+0.86%
1999	676	+1.56%
2007	735	+1.05%
2012	796	+1.61%
2017	777	−0.48%
2023	748	−0.63%
Source: INSEE

== Sights ==
The commune's biggest tourist attraction is the Island of Chambod which also has a camp site. There is also the Donjon de Buenc which used to be an outpost along the Savoy frontier. The village of Hautecourt is also home to a rare type of cave which is only accessed once every seven years so as not to disturb the many species that are indigenous to it.

== Sports ==
The commune also has a football team who regularly play in Hautecourt in their home colours of purple.

== See also ==
- Communes of the Ain department
