= Jasseron =

Commune in Auvergne-Rhône-Alpes, France

- Commune
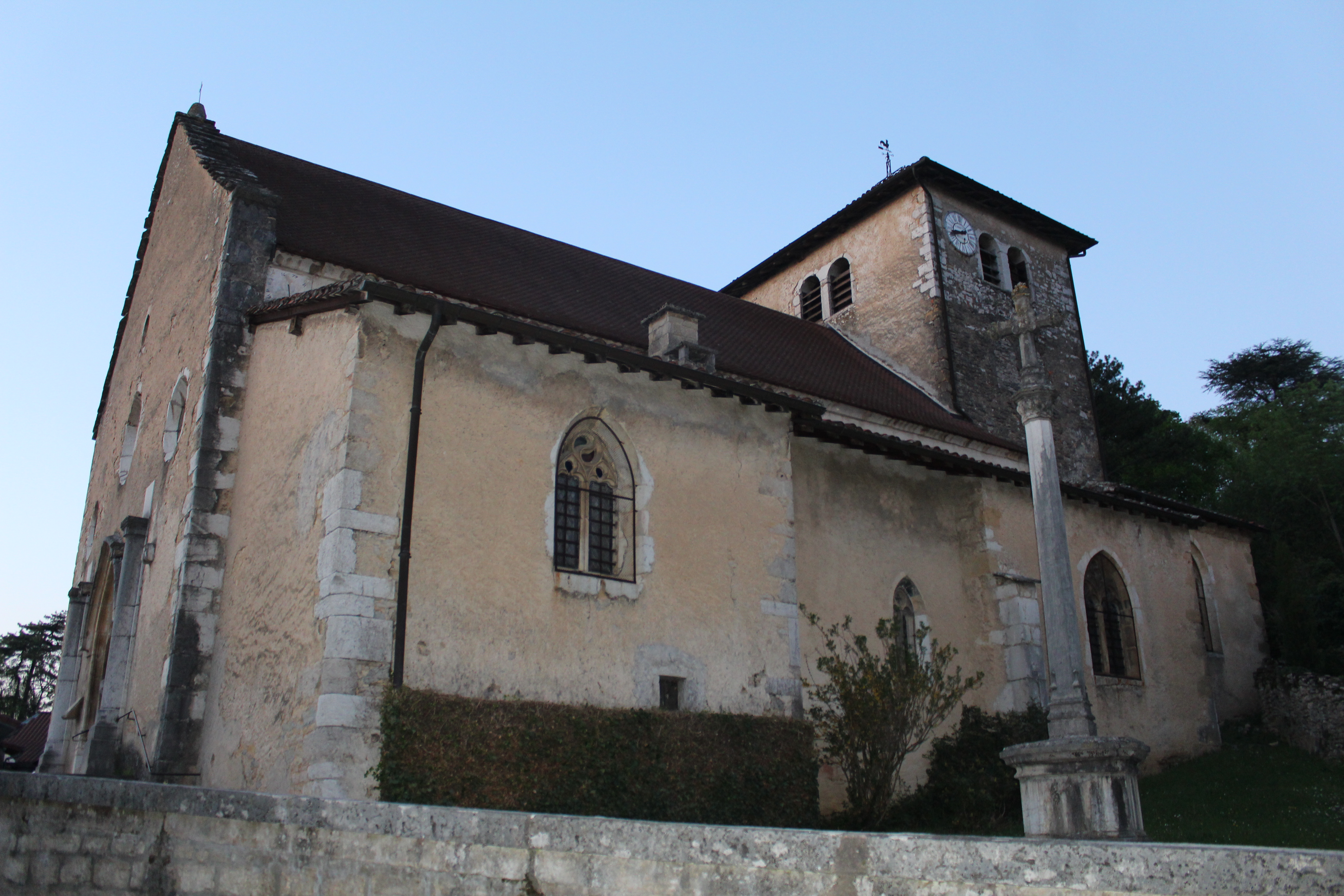
- Church of St. John the Baptist

- Coat of arms
- Location of Jasseron
- Location within France Location within Auvergne-Rhône-Alpes
- Coordinates: 46°13′00″N 5°20′00″E
- Country: France
- Region: Auvergne-Rhône-Alpes
- Department: Ain
- Arrondissement: Bourg-en-Bresse
- Canton: Saint-Étienne-du-Bois
- Intercommunality: CA Bassin de Bourg-en-Bresse

Government
  - Mayor (2026–32): Sébastien Gobert
- Area^{1}: 18.93 km^{2} (7.31 sq mi)
- Elevation: 320 m (1,050 ft)
- Highest elevation: 590 m (1,940 ft)
- Lowest elevation: 246 m (807 ft)
- Population (2023): 1,917
  - Density: 101.3/km^{2} (262.3/sq mi)
- Time zone: UTC+01:00 (CET)
  - Summer (DST): UTC+02:00 (CEST)
- INSEE/Postal code: 01195 /01250
- ^{1} French Land Register data, which excludes lakes, ponds, glaciers > 1 km^{2} (0.386 sq mi or 247 acres) and river estuaries.

Jasseron (French pronunciation: [ʒasʁɔ̃]; Occitan: Jâsseron) is a commune in the Ain department in eastern France.

It is located 7 km (4.3 mi) east of Bourg-en-Bresse.

== Population ==
Historical population
Year	Pop.	±% p.a.
1968	654	—
1975	716	+1.30%
1982	954	+4.18%
1990	1,079	+1.55%
1999	1,256	+1.70%
2007	1,394	+1.31%
2012	1,664	+3.60%
2017	1,755	+1.07%
2023	1,917	+1.48%
Source: INSEE

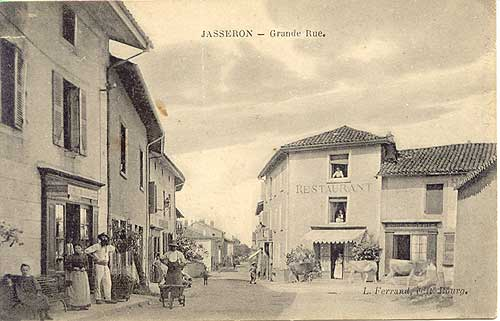
Jasseron c.1900

== See also ==
- Communes of the Ain department
