= Bohas-Meyriat-Rignat =

Commune in Auvergne-Rhône-Alpes, France

- Commune
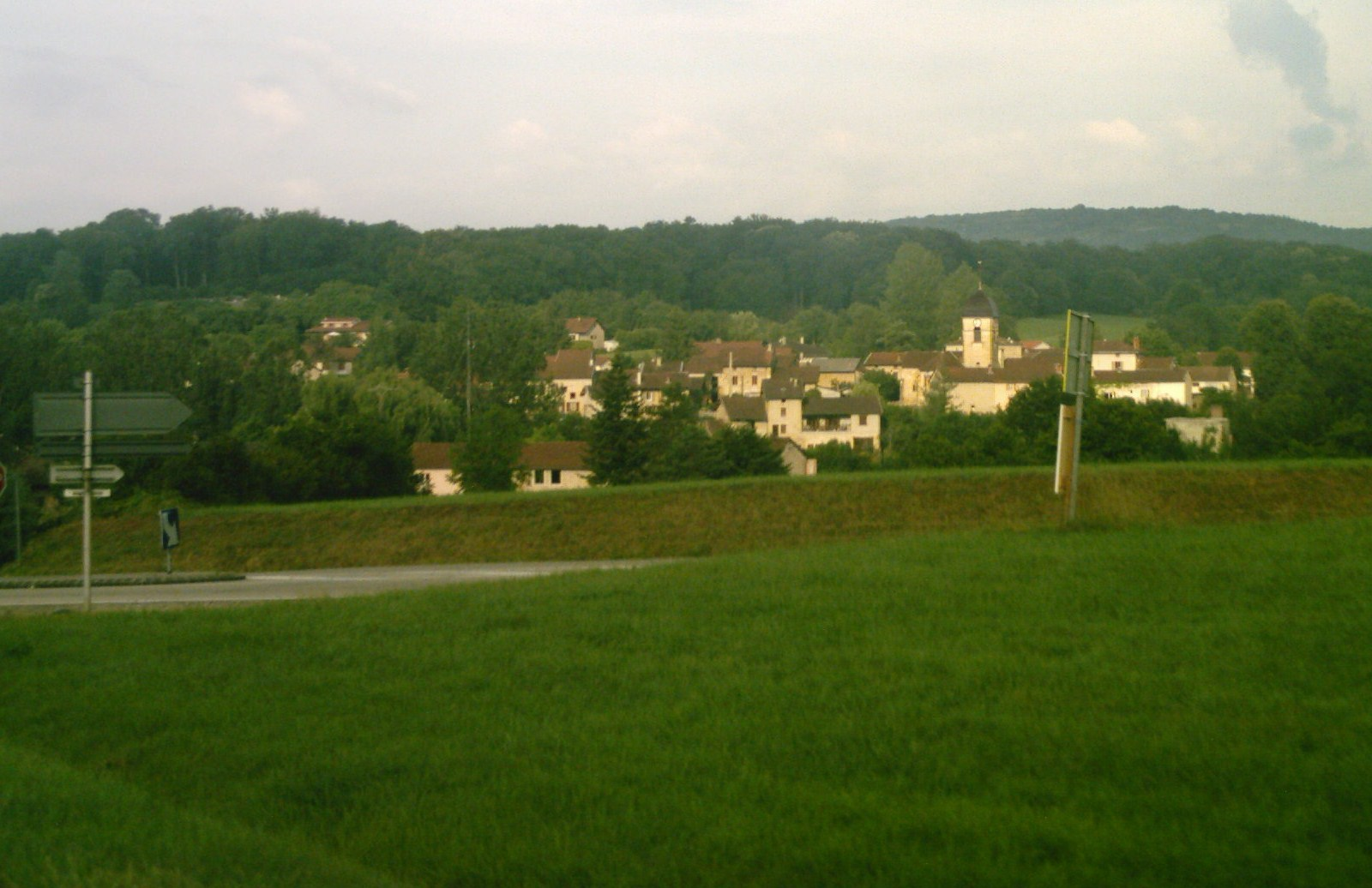
- Location of Bohas-Meyriat-Rignat
- Location within France Location within Auvergne-Rhône-Alpes
- Coordinates: 46°08′14″N 5°23′28″E
- Country: France
- Region: Auvergne-Rhône-Alpes
- Department: Ain
- Arrondissement: Bourg-en-Bresse
- Canton: Saint-Étienne-du-Bois
- Intercommunality: CA Bassin de Bourg-en-Bresse

Government
  - Mayor (2026–32): Nicole Carry
- Area^{1}: 23.51 km^{2} (9.08 sq mi)
- Elevation: 420 m (1,380 ft)
- Highest elevation: 555 m (1,821 ft)
- Lowest elevation: 264 m (866 ft)
- Population (2023): 938
  - Density: 39.9/km^{2} (103/sq mi)
- Time zone: UTC+01:00 (CET)
  - Summer (DST): UTC+02:00 (CEST)
- INSEE/Postal code: 01245 /01250
- Website: https://bohasmeyriatrignat.grandbourg.fr/
- ^{1} French Land Register data, which excludes lakes, ponds, glaciers > 1 km^{2} (0.386 sq mi or 247 acres) and river estuaries.

Bohas-Meyriat-Rignat is a commune in the Ain department in eastern France.

== History ==
The commune was created in January 1974 as a grouping of the three villages Bohas, Meyriat, and Rignat.

== Population ==
Historical population
Year	Pop.	±% p.a.
1968	537	—
1975	506	−0.85%
1982	597	+2.39%
1990	657	+1.20%
1999	727	+1.13%
2007	805	+1.28%
2012	853	+1.17%
2017	913	+1.37%
2023	938	+0.45%
Source: INSEE

== See also ==
- Communes of the Ain department
