= Nivigne et Suran =

Commune in Auvergne-Rhône-Alpes, France

- Commune
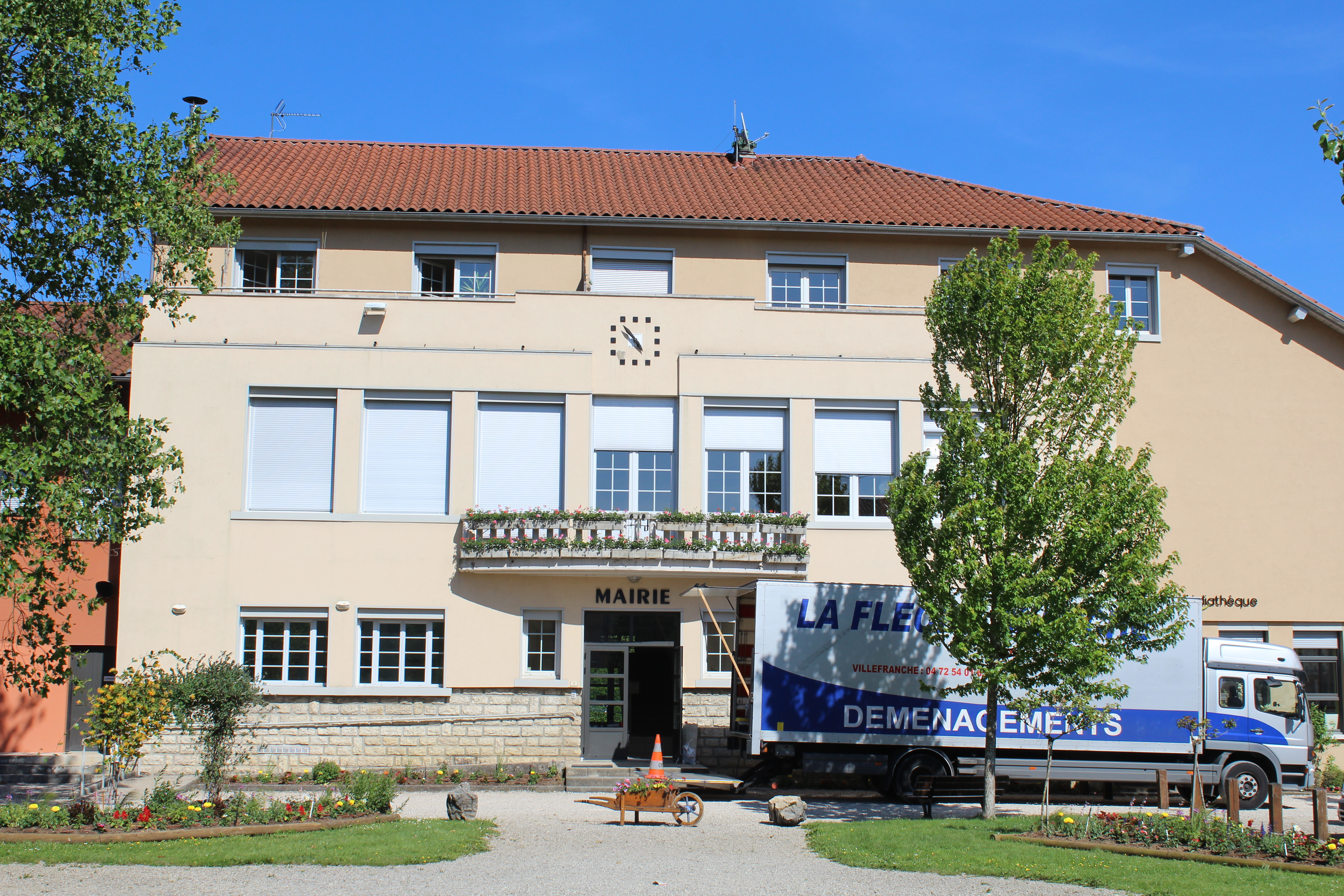
- Town hall
- Location of Nivigne et Suran
- Location within France Location within Auvergne-Rhône-Alpes
- Coordinates: 46°15′50″N 5°25′41″E
- Country: France
- Region: Auvergne-Rhône-Alpes
- Department: Ain
- Arrondissement: Bourg-en-Bresse
- Canton: Saint-Étienne-du-Bois
- Intercommunality: Bassin de Bourg-en-Bresse

Government
  - Mayor (2026–32): Bernard Prin
- Area^{1}: 30.98 km^{2} (11.96 sq mi)
- Population (2023): 820
  - Density: 26/km^{2} (69/sq mi)
- Time zone: UTC+01:00 (CET)
  - Summer (DST): UTC+02:00 (CEST)
- INSEE/Postal code: 01095 /01250
- ^{1} French Land Register data, which excludes lakes, ponds, glaciers > 1 km^{2} (0.386 sq mi or 247 acres) and river estuaries.

Nivigne et Suran (French pronunciation: [niviɲ e syʁɑ̃]) is a commune in the department of Ain, eastern France. The municipality was established on 1 January 2017 by merger of the former communes of Chavannes-sur-Suran and Germagnat.

== Politics and administration ==
=== Municipal administration ===
List of delegated communes
Name	Code INSEE	Intercommunality	Area (km^{2})	Population (2018)	Density (per km^{2})
Chavannes-sur-Suran (seat)	01095	CC de Treffort en Revermont	21.5	673	31
Germagnat	01172	CC de Treffort en Revermont	9.48	145	15

==== List of mayors of Nivigne et Suran ====
List of successive mayors of Nivigne et Suran
In office		Mayor	Party	Capacity	Ref.
1 January 2017	Incumbent	Bernard Prin		Mayor of Chavannes-sur-Suran (2008-2014)	

==== List of delegated mayors for Chavannes-sur-Suran and Germagnat ====
In addition to the mayor for the commune as a whole, each of the former municipalities are also represented by a delegated mayor to the conseil municipal.

List of successive delegated mayors for Chavannes-sur-Suran and Germagnat
Chavannes-sur-Suran						Germagnat					
In office		Delegated mayor	Party	Capacity	Ref.	In office		Delegated mayor	Party	Capacity	Ref.
1 January 2017	Incumbent	Jean-Jacques Laurent	SE	Mayor of Chavannes-sur-Suran (2014-2017)		1 January 2017	Incumbent	Alain Binard	SE	Mayor of Germagnat (2014-2017)	

== See also ==
- Communes of the Ain department
