= Chavannes-sur-Suran =

Part of Nivigne et Suran in Auvergne-Rhône-Alpes, France

- Part of Nivigne et Suran
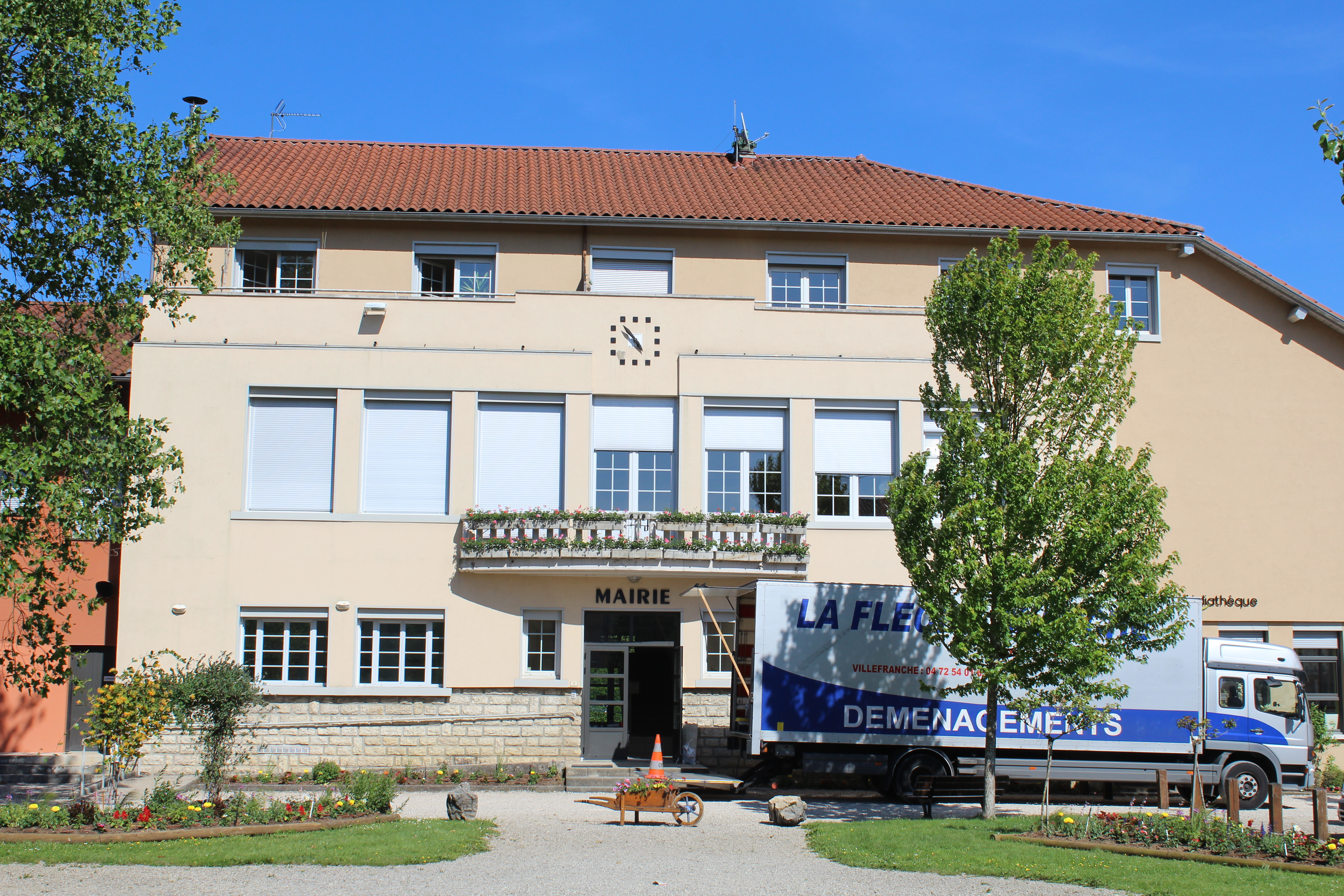
- Town hall
- Location of Chavannes-sur-Suran
- Location within France Location within Auvergne-Rhône-Alpes
- Coordinates: 46°15′51″N 5°25′39″E
- Country: France
- Region: Auvergne-Rhône-Alpes
- Department: Ain
- Arrondissement: Bourg-en-Bresse
- Canton: Saint-Étienne-du-Bois
- Commune: Nivigne et Suran
- Area^{1}: 21.5 km^{2} (8.3 sq mi)
- Elevation: 318 m (1,043 ft)
- Highest elevation: 770 m (2,530 ft)
- Lowest elevation: 306 m (1,004 ft)
- Population (2019): 701
  - Density: 32.6/km^{2} (84.4/sq mi)
- Time zone: UTC+01:00 (CET)
  - Summer (DST): UTC+02:00 (CEST)
- Postal code: 01250
- ^{1} French Land Register data, which excludes lakes, ponds, glaciers > 1 km^{2} (0.386 sq mi or 247 acres) and river estuaries.

Chavannes-sur-Suran (French pronunciation: [ʃavan syʁ syʁɑ̃]) is a former commune in the Ain department in eastern France. On 1 January 2017, it was merged into the new commune Nivigne et Suran.

== Population ==
Historical population
Year	Pop.	±% p.a.
2006	617	—
2011	638	+0.67%
2019	701	+1.18%
Source: INSEE

== See also ==
- Communes of the Ain department
