= Pouillat =

Commune in Auvergne-Rhône-Alpes, France

- Commune
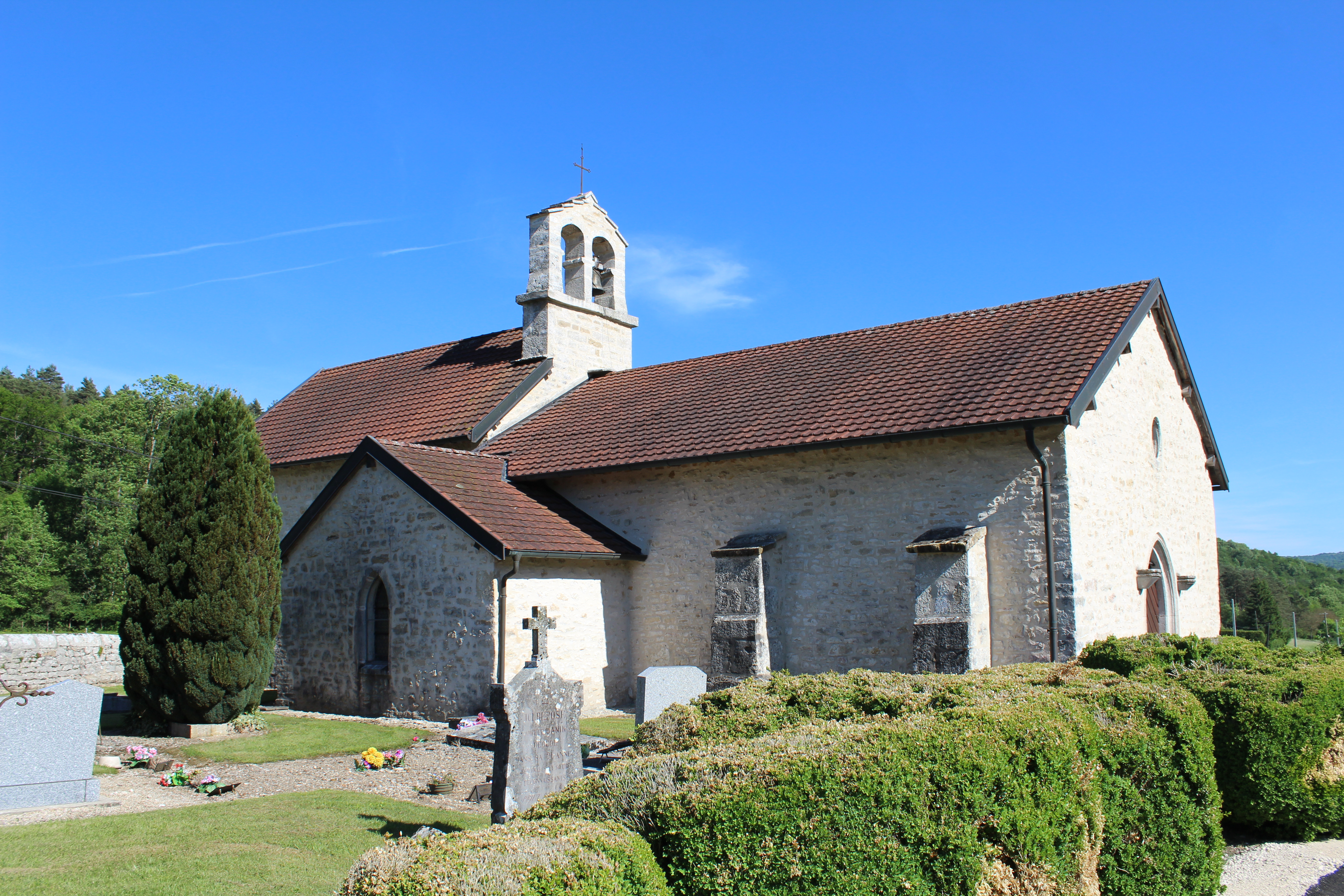
- Location of Pouillat
- Location within France Location within Auvergne-Rhône-Alpes
- Coordinates: 46°19′41″N 5°25′45″E
- Country: France
- Region: Auvergne-Rhône-Alpes
- Department: Ain
- Arrondissement: Bourg-en-Bresse
- Canton: Saint-Étienne-du-Bois
- Intercommunality: CA Bassin de Bourg-en-Bresse

Government
  - Mayor (2026–32): Jean-Pierre Revel
- Area^{1}: 6.23 km^{2} (2.41 sq mi)
- Elevation: 363 m (1,191 ft)
- Highest elevation: 770 m (2,530 ft)
- Lowest elevation: 333 m (1,093 ft)
- Population (2023): 77
  - Density: 12/km^{2} (32/sq mi)
- Time zone: UTC+01:00 (CET)
  - Summer (DST): UTC+02:00 (CEST)
- INSEE/Postal code: 01309 /01250
- ^{1} French Land Register data, which excludes lakes, ponds, glaciers > 1 km^{2} (0.386 sq mi or 247 acres) and river estuaries.

Pouillat (French pronunciation: [puja]) is a commune in the Ain department in eastern France.

== Population ==
Historical population
Year	Pop.	±% p.a.
1968	48	—
1975	35	−4.41%
1982	26	−4.16%
1990	38	+4.86%
1999	58	+4.81%
2007	79	+3.94%
2012	92	+3.09%
2017	88	−0.89%
2023	77	−2.20%
Source: INSEE

== See also ==
- Communes of the Ain department
