= Saint-Étienne-du-Bois, Ain =

Commune in Auvergne-Rhône-Alpes, France

Saint-Étienne-du-Bois
- Commune
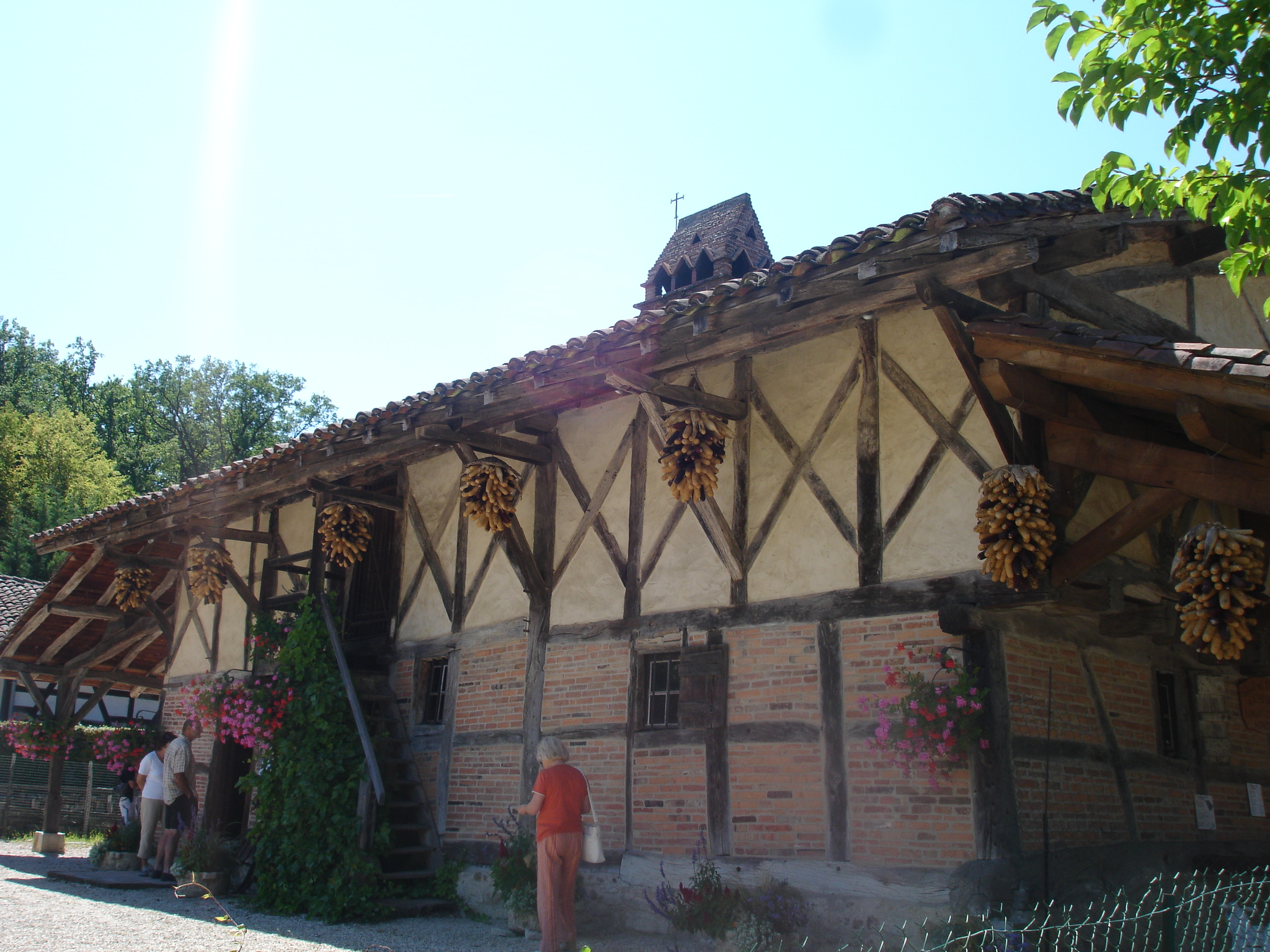
- Mangettes farm

- Coat of arms
- Location of Saint-Étienne-du-Bois
- Location within France Location within Auvergne-Rhône-Alpes
- Coordinates: 46°17′19″N 5°17′39″E
- Country: France
- Region: Auvergne-Rhône-Alpes
- Department: Ain
- Arrondissement: Bourg-en-Bresse
- Canton: Saint-Étienne-du-Bois
- Intercommunality: CA Bassin de Bourg-en-Bresse

Government
  - Mayor (2026–32): Alain Chapuis
- Area^{1}: 28.38 km^{2} (10.96 sq mi)
- Elevation: 235 m (771 ft)
- Highest elevation: 259 m (850 ft)
- Lowest elevation: 213 m (699 ft)
- Population (2023): 2,584
  - Density: 91.05/km^{2} (235.8/sq mi)
- Time zone: UTC+01:00 (CET)
  - Summer (DST): UTC+02:00 (CEST)
- INSEE/Postal code: 01350 /01370
- ^{1} French Land Register data, which excludes lakes, ponds, glaciers > 1 km^{2} (0.386 sq mi or 247 acres) and river estuaries.

Saint-Étienne-du-Bois (French pronunciation: [sɛ̃tetjɛn dy bwa]) is a commune in the Ain department, eastern France.

== Geography ==
The Sevron forms part of the commune's eastern border then flows northwest through the commune.

=== Climate ===
Saint-Étienne-du-Bois has an oceanic climate (Köppen climate classification Cfb). The average annual temperature in Saint-Étienne-du-Bois is 11.5 °C (52.7 °F). The average annual rainfall is 1,137.6 mm (44.79 in) with October as the wettest month. The temperatures are highest on average in July, at around 20.4 °C (68.7 °F), and lowest in January, at around 2.6 °C (36.7 °F). The highest temperature ever recorded in Saint-Étienne-du-Bois was 39.4 °C (102.9 °F) on 13 August 2003; the coldest temperature ever recorded was −17.8 °C (0.0 °F) on 30 December 2005.

Climate data for Saint-Étienne-du-Bois (1981–2010 averages, extremes 1998−2020)
Month	Jan	Feb	Mar	Apr	May	Jun	Jul	Aug	Sep	Oct	Nov	Dec	Year
Record high °C (°F)	18.2 (64.8)	20.0 (68.0)	23.5 (74.3)	28.8 (83.8)	33.1 (91.6)	37.3 (99.1)	39.1 (102.4)	39.4 (102.9)	34.3 (93.7)	27.5 (81.5)	22.8 (73.0)	17.5 (63.5)	39.4 (102.9)
Mean daily maximum °C (°F)	5.8 (42.4)	7.9 (46.2)	12.6 (54.7)	16.7 (62.1)	21.1 (70.0)	25.1 (77.2)	26.6 (79.9)	26.1 (79.0)	21.9 (71.4)	17.0 (62.6)	10.0 (50.0)	5.9 (42.6)	16.4 (61.5)
Daily mean °C (°F)	2.6 (36.7)	3.9 (39.0)	7.5 (45.5)	11.0 (51.8)	15.4 (59.7)	18.9 (66.0)	20.4 (68.7)	19.8 (67.6)	16.3 (61.3)	12.6 (54.7)	6.6 (43.9)	2.9 (37.2)	11.5 (52.7)
Mean daily minimum °C (°F)	−0.7 (30.7)	−0.1 (31.8)	2.4 (36.3)	5.2 (41.4)	9.7 (49.5)	12.7 (54.9)	14.2 (57.6)	13.6 (56.5)	10.7 (51.3)	8.2 (46.8)	3.2 (37.8)	0.0 (32.0)	6.6 (43.9)
Record low °C (°F)	−15.9 (3.4)	−16.5 (2.3)	−12.6 (9.3)	−6.7 (19.9)	−0.2 (31.6)	2.8 (37.0)	5.8 (42.4)	3.5 (38.3)	1.2 (34.2)	−5.8 (21.6)	−11.2 (11.8)	−17.8 (0.0)	−17.8 (0.0)
Average precipitation mm (inches)	80.6 (3.17)	83.7 (3.30)	91.5 (3.60)	92.3 (3.63)	109.3 (4.30)	67.3 (2.65)	90.1 (3.55)	96.8 (3.81)	94.7 (3.73)	127.4 (5.02)	117.7 (4.63)	86.2 (3.39)	1,137.6 (44.79)
Average precipitation days (≥ 1.0 mm)	12.5	10.6	11.7	9.8	12.3	7.8	9.3	10.7	9.2	12.3	12.6	12.3	131.0
Source: Meteociel

== Population ==
Historical population

Year	Pop.	±% p.a.
1793	1,629	—
1800	1,405	−2.09%
1806	1,207	−2.50%
1821	1,521	+1.55%
1831	1,605	+0.54%
1836	1,640	+0.43%
1841	1,646	+0.07%
1846	1,672	+0.31%
1851	1,710	+0.45%
1856	1,648	−0.74%
1861	1,613	−0.43%
1866	1,652	+0.48%
1872	1,603	−0.50%
1876	1,558	−0.71%
1881	1,502	−0.73%
1886	1,607	+1.36%
1891	1,551	−0.71%
1896	1,528	−0.30%
1901	1,518	−0.13%

Year	Pop.	±% p.a.
1906	1,507	−0.15%
1911	1,505	−0.03%
1921	1,368	−0.95%
1926	1,378	+0.15%
1931	1,382	+0.06%
1936	1,383	+0.01%
1946	1,422	+0.28%
1954	1,435	+0.11%
1962	1,349	−0.77%
1968	1,355	+0.07%
1975	1,443	+0.90%
1982	1,876	+3.82%
1990	1,982	+0.69%
1999	2,046	+0.35%
2007	2,397	+2.00%
2012	2,489	+0.76%
2017	2,448	−0.33%
2023	2,584	+0.91%

Source: EHESS and INSEE (1968-2023)

== See also ==
- Communes of the Ain department
