= Cize, Ain =

Commune in Auvergne-Rhône-Alpes, France

Cize
- Commune
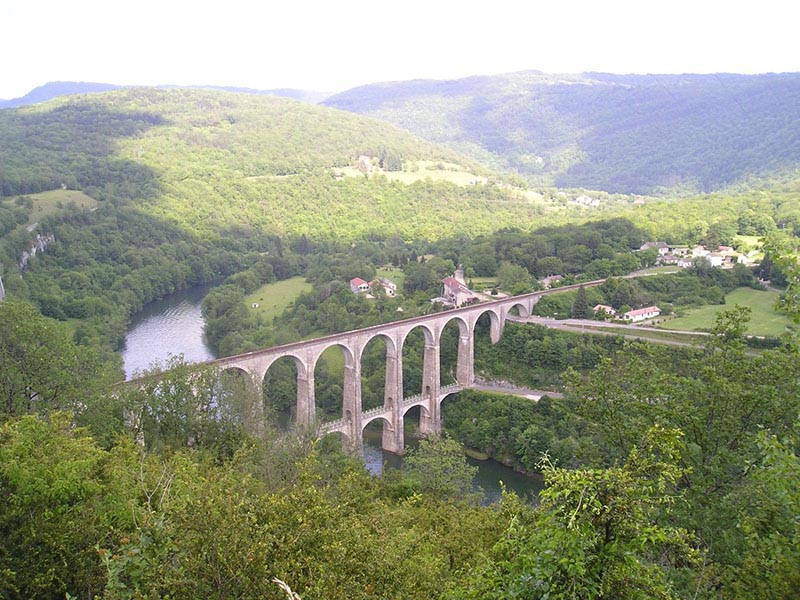
- Cize–Bolozon railway viaduct
- Location of Cize
- Location within France Location within Auvergne-Rhône-Alpes
- Coordinates: 46°12′15″N 5°26′45″E
- Country: France
- Region: Auvergne-Rhône-Alpes
- Department: Ain
- Arrondissement: Bourg-en-Bresse
- Canton: Saint-Étienne-du-Bois
- Intercommunality: Bassin de Bourg-en-Bresse

Government
  - Mayor (2026–32): Véronique Bibet
- Area^{1}: 4.52 km^{2} (1.75 sq mi)
- Elevation: 433 m (1,421 ft)
- Highest elevation: 540 m (1,770 ft)
- Lowest elevation: 264 m (866 ft)
- Population (2023): 168
  - Density: 37.2/km^{2} (96.3/sq mi)
- Time zone: UTC+01:00 (CET)
  - Summer (DST): UTC+02:00 (CEST)
- INSEE/Postal code: 01106 /01250
- ^{1} French Land Register data, which excludes lakes, ponds, glaciers > 1 km^{2} (0.386 sq mi or 247 acres) and river estuaries.

Cize (French pronunciation: [siz]) is a commune in the Ain department in eastern France.

== Population ==
Historical population
Year	Pop.	±% p.a.
1968	126	—
1975	128	+0.23%
1982	108	−2.40%
1990	112	+0.46%
1999	127	+1.41%
2007	150	+2.10%
2012	173	+2.89%
2017	173	+0.00%
2023	168	−0.49%
Source: INSEE

== See also ==
- Communes of the Ain department
