= Courmangoux =

Commune in Auvergne-Rhône-Alpes, France

Courmangoux Cort-Mangôd (Arpitan)
- Commune
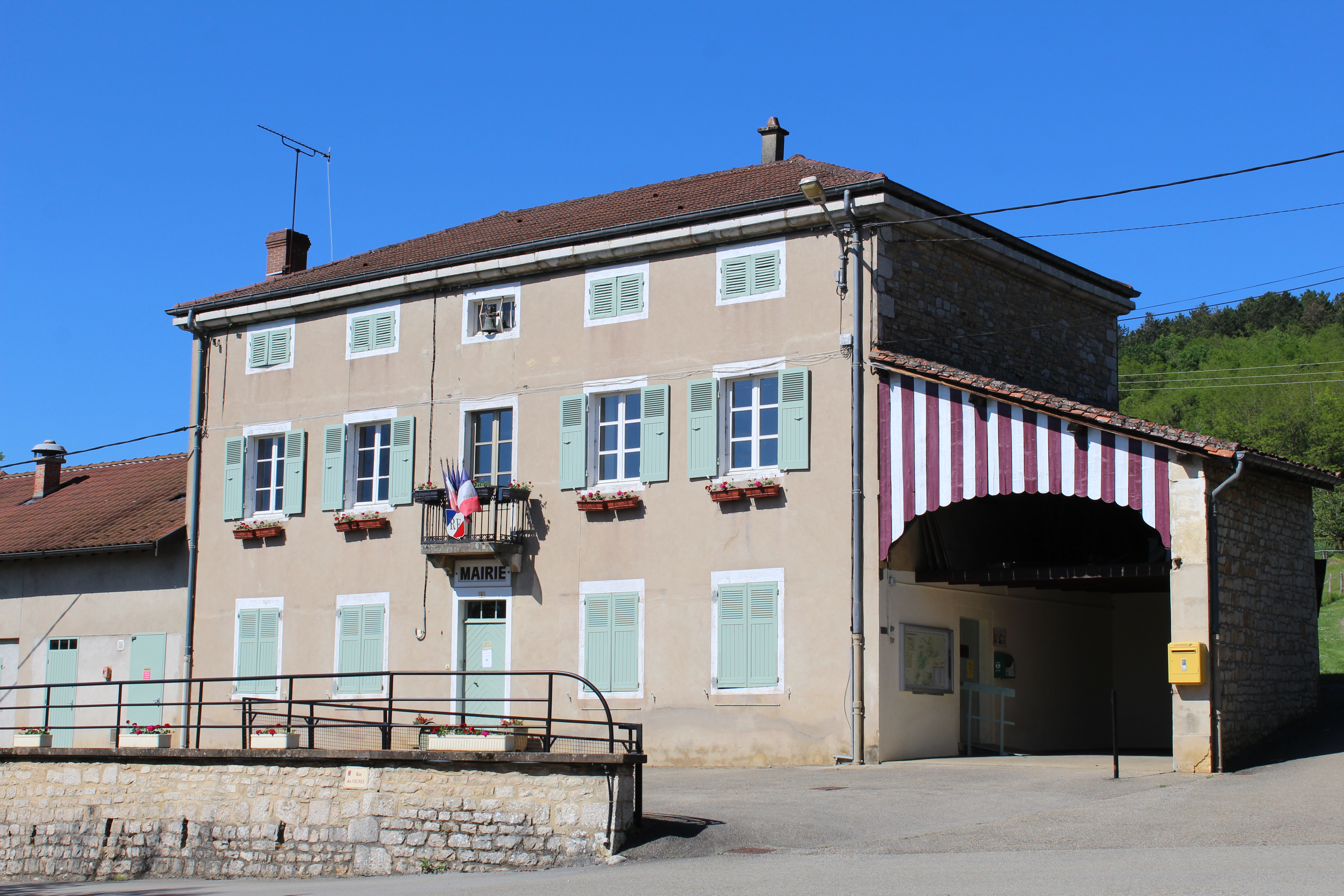
- Town hall

- Coat of arms
- Location of Courmangoux
- Location within France Location within Auvergne-Rhône-Alpes
- Coordinates: 46°19′55″N 5°22′11″E
- Country: France
- Region: Auvergne-Rhône-Alpes
- Department: Ain
- Arrondissement: Bourg-en-Bresse
- Canton: Saint-Étienne-du-Bois
- Intercommunality: CA Bassin de Bourg-en-Bresse

Government
  - Mayor (2026–32): Sébastien Chorrier-Collet
- Area^{1}: 14.82 km^{2} (5.72 sq mi)
- Elevation: 300 m (980 ft)
- Highest elevation: 652 m (2,139 ft)
- Lowest elevation: 211 m (692 ft)
- Population (2023): 522
  - Density: 35.2/km^{2} (91.2/sq mi)
- Time zone: UTC+01:00 (CET)
  - Summer (DST): UTC+02:00 (CEST)
- INSEE/Postal code: 01127 /01370
- ^{1} French Land Register data, which excludes lakes, ponds, glaciers > 1 km^{2} (0.386 sq mi or 247 acres) and river estuaries.

Courmangoux (French pronunciation: [kuʁmɑ̃ɡu]; Arpitan: Cort-Mangôd) is a commune in the Ain department in eastern France.

== Population ==
Historical population
Year	Pop.	±% p.a.
1968	354	—
1975	296	−2.52%
1982	310	+0.66%
1990	327	+0.67%
1999	360	+1.07%
2007	476	+3.55%
2012	507	+1.27%
2017	507	+0.00%
2023	522	+0.49%
Source: INSEE

== See also ==
- Communes of the Ain department
