= Corveissiat =

Commune in Auvergne-Rhône-Alpes, France

- Commune
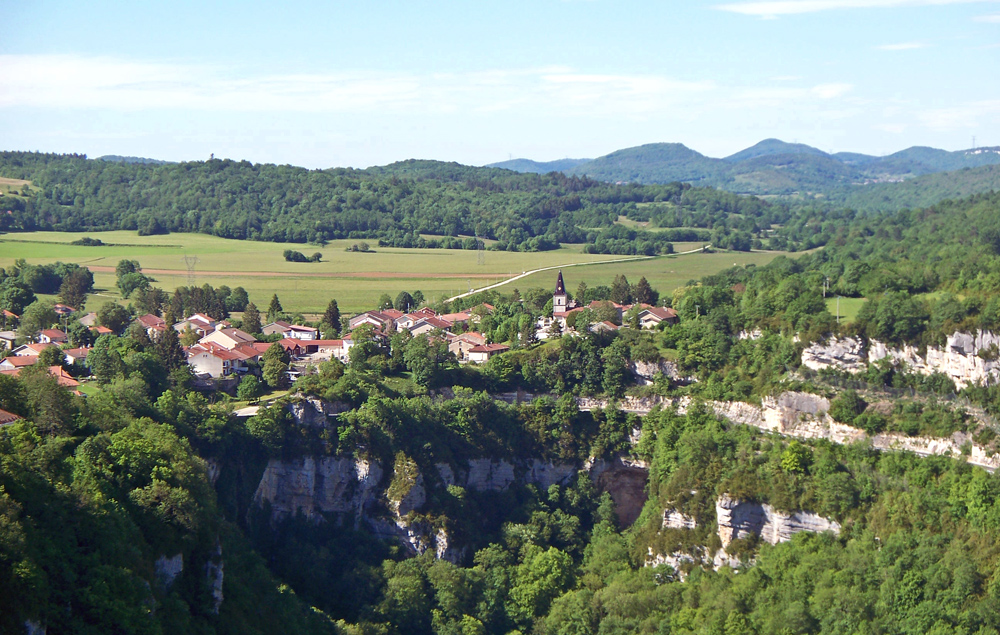
- Location of Corveissiat
- Location within France Location within Auvergne-Rhône-Alpes
- Coordinates: 46°14′38″N 5°28′55″E
- Country: France
- Region: Auvergne-Rhône-Alpes
- Department: Ain
- Arrondissement: Bourg-en-Bresse
- Canton: Saint-Étienne-du-Bois
- Intercommunality: CA Bassin de Bourg-en-Bresse

Government
  - Mayor (2026–32): Jonathan Gindre
- Area^{1}: 22.69 km^{2} (8.76 sq mi)
- Elevation: 460 m (1,510 ft)
- Highest elevation: 668 m (2,192 ft)
- Lowest elevation: 262 m (860 ft)
- Population (2023): 601
  - Density: 26.5/km^{2} (68.6/sq mi)
- Time zone: UTC+01:00 (CET)
  - Summer (DST): UTC+02:00 (CEST)
- INSEE/Postal code: 01125 /01250
- ^{1} French Land Register data, which excludes lakes, ponds, glaciers > 1 km^{2} (0.386 sq mi or 247 acres) and river estuaries.

Corveissiat (French pronunciation: [kɔʁvesja]) is a commune in the Ain department in eastern France.

== Population ==
Historical population
Year	Pop.	±% p.a.
1968	448	—
1975	411	−1.22%
1982	438	+0.91%
1990	437	−0.03%
1999	469	+0.79%
2007	530	+1.54%
2012	614	+2.99%
2017	621	+0.23%
2023	601	−0.54%
Source: INSEE

== See also ==
- Communes of the Ain department
