= Canton of Saint-Étienne-du-Bois =

Canton in Auvergne-Rhône-Alpes, France

Coordinates: 46.28°N 5.28°E

- Canton
- Situation of the canton of Saint-Étienne-du-Bois in the department of Ain
- Country: France
- Region: Auvergne-Rhône-Alpes
- Department: Ain
- No. of communes: {{{nbcomm}}}
- Population (2023): 23,169
- INSEE code: 0118

The canton of Saint-Étienne-du-Bois is an administrative division of the Ain department, in eastern France. It was created at the French canton reorganisation which came into effect in March 2015. Its seat is in Saint-Étienne-du-Bois.

It consists of the following communes:

1. Beaupont
2. Bény
3. Bohas-Meyriat-Rignat
4. Cize
5. Coligny
6. Cormoz
7. Corveissiat
8. Courmangoux
9. Domsure
10. Drom
11. Grand-Corent
12. Hautecourt-Romanèche
13. Jasseron
14. Marboz
15. Meillonnas
16. Nivigne et Suran
17. Pirajoux
18. Pouillat
19. Ramasse
20. Saint-Étienne-du-Bois
21. Salavre
22. Simandre-sur-Suran
23. Val-Revermont
24. Verjon
25. Villemotier
26. Villereversure
