= Canton of Pont-de-Veyle =

Coordinates: 46°15′49″N 4°53′19″E

Pont-de-Veyle
- Former canton
- Interactive map of Pont-de-Veyle
- Country: France
- Region: Auvergne-Rhône-Alpes
- Department: Ain
- No. of communes: {{{nbcomm}}}
- Disbanded: 2015
- Area: 123.46 km^{2} (47.67 sq mi)
- Population (2012): 13,162
  - Density: 106.61/km^{2} (276.12/sq mi)

The canton of Pont-de-Veyle is a former administrative division in eastern France. It was disbanded following the French canton reorganisation which came into effect in March 2015. It consisted of 12 communes, which joined the new canton of Vonnas in 2015. It had 13,162 inhabitants (2012).

The canton comprised 12 communes:

- Bey
- Cormoranche-sur-Saône
- Crottet
- Cruzilles-lès-Mépillat
- Grièges
- Laiz
- Perrex
- Pont-de-Veyle
- Saint-André-d'Huiriat
- Saint-Cyr-sur-Menthon
- Saint-Genis-sur-Menthon
- Saint-Jean-sur-Veyle

== Demographics ==
Historical population Canton of Pont-de-Veyle
Year	1962	1968	1975	1982	1990	1999
Pop.	6,896	7,335	7,766	8,808	10,276	11,079
±%	—	+6.4%	+5.9%	+13.4%	+16.7%	+7.8%
From the year 1962 on: No double counting – residents of multiple communes (e.g. students and military personnel) are counted only once. Source: INSEE

== See also ==
- Cantons of the Ain department
