= Saint-Laurent-sur-Saône =

Commune in Auvergne-Rhône-Alpes, France

- Commune
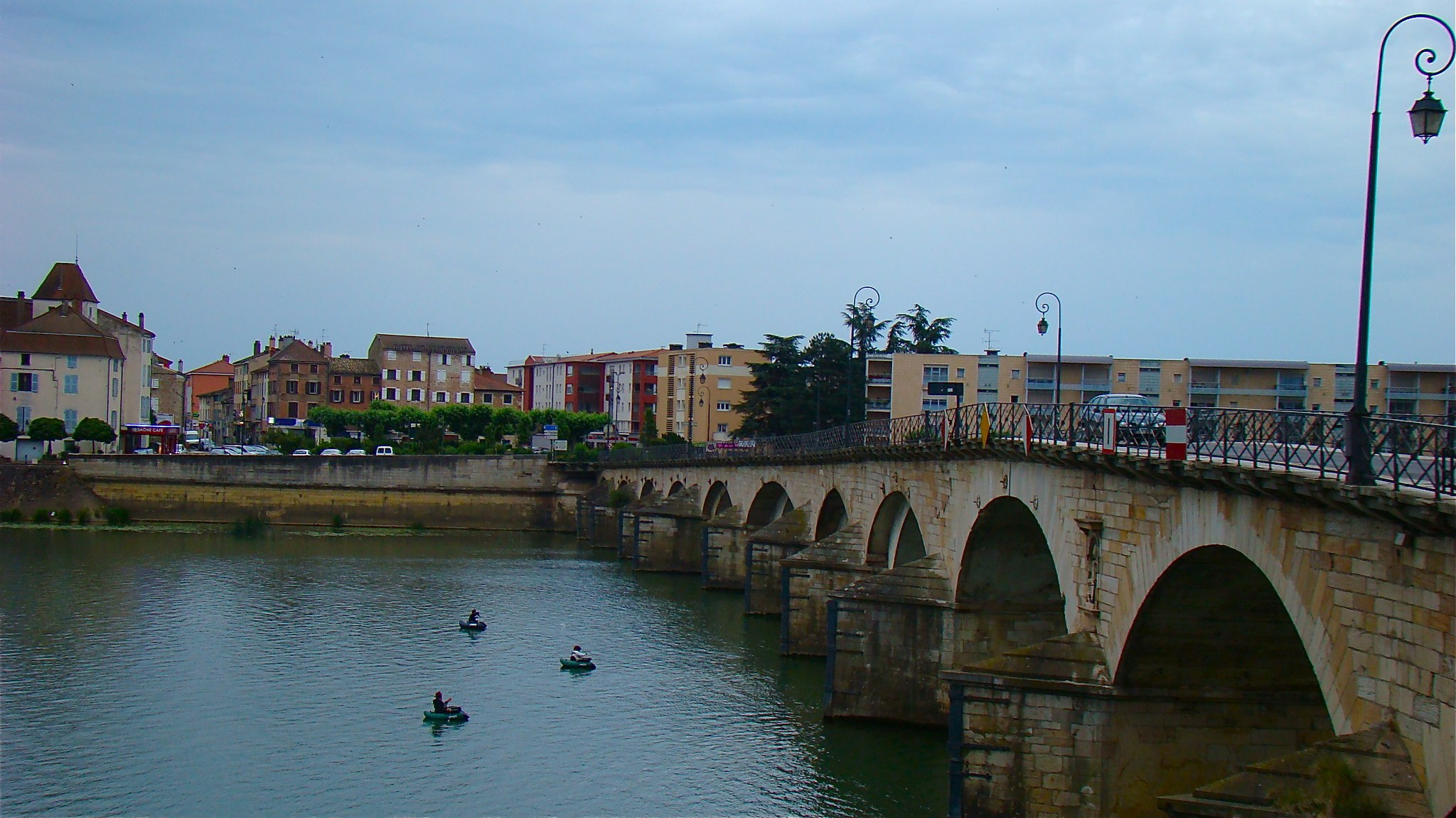
- Saint-Laurent bridge

- Coat of arms
- Location of Saint-Laurent-sur-Saône
- Location within France Location within Auvergne-Rhône-Alpes
- Coordinates: 46°18′19″N 4°50′21″E
- Country: France
- Region: Auvergne-Rhône-Alpes
- Department: Ain
- Arrondissement: Bourg-en-Bresse
- Canton: Vonnas
- Intercommunality: Mâconnais Beaujolais Agglomération

Government
  - Mayor (2026–32): Jacques Doussot
- Area^{1}: 0.53 km^{2} (0.20 sq mi)
- Highest elevation: 174 m (571 ft)
- Lowest elevation: 167 m (548 ft)
- Population (2023): 1,810
  - Density: 3,400/km^{2} (8,800/sq mi)
- Time zone: UTC+01:00 (CET)
  - Summer (DST): UTC+02:00 (CEST)
- INSEE/Postal code: 01370 /01750
- ^{1} French Land Register data, which excludes lakes, ponds, glaciers > 1 km^{2} (0.386 sq mi or 247 acres) and river estuaries.

Saint-Laurent-sur-Saône (French pronunciation: [sɛ̃ loʁɑ̃ syʁ son], literally Saint-Laurent on Saône) is a commune in the Ain department in eastern France. It lies on the left bank of the Saône, across from the city of Mâcon.

== Population ==
Historical population
Year	Pop.	±% p.a.
1968	2,041	—
1975	1,967	−0.53%
1982	1,813	−1.16%
1990	1,710	−0.73%
1999	1,655	−0.36%
2007	1,727	+0.53%
2012	1,770	+0.49%
2017	1,722	−0.55%
2023	1,810	+0.83%
Source: INSEE

== See also ==
- Communes of the Ain department
