= Biziat =

Commune in Auvergne-Rhône-Alpes, France

- Commune
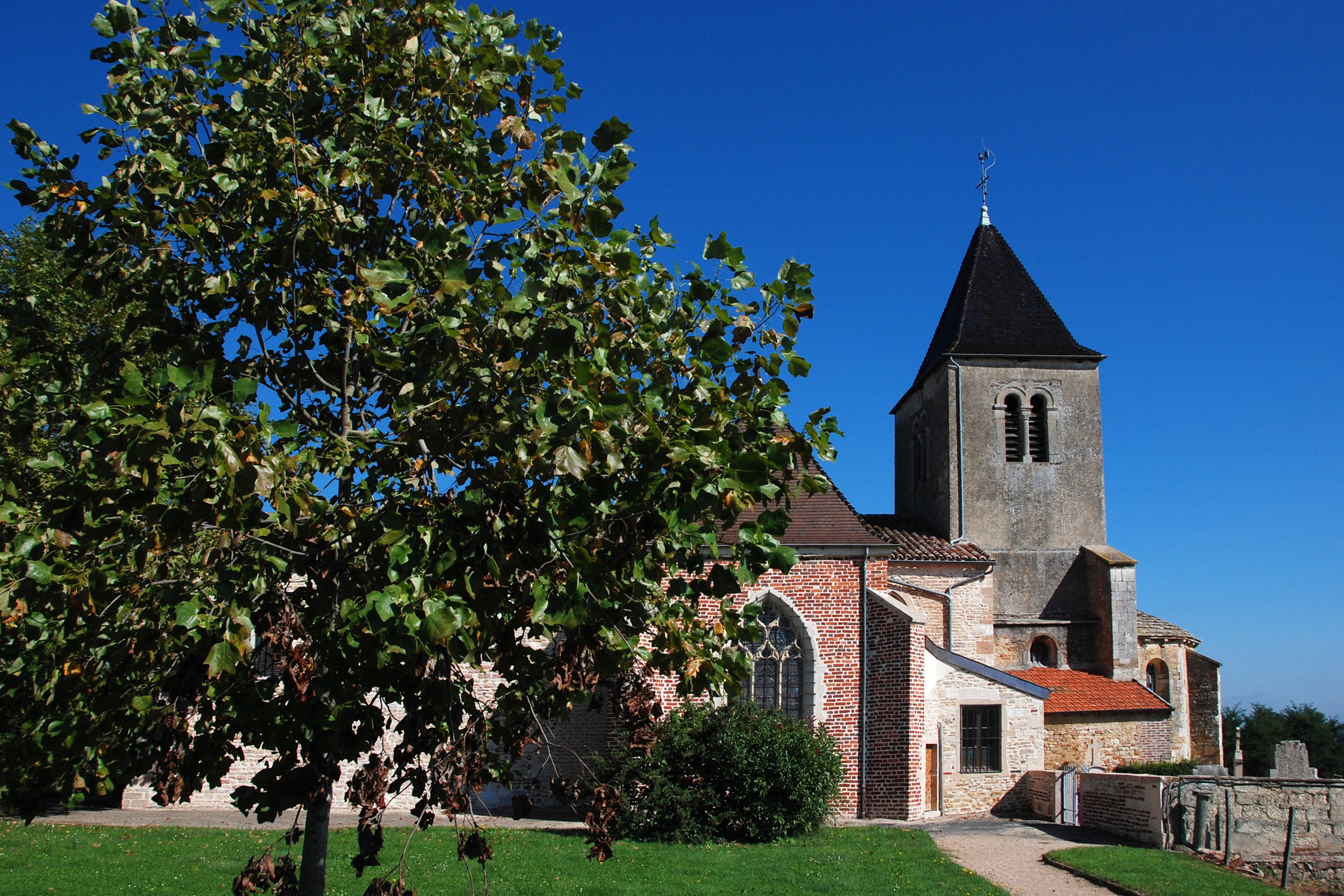
- Location of Biziat
- Location within France Location within Auvergne-Rhône-Alpes
- Coordinates: 46°13′00″N 4°56′00″E
- Country: France
- Region: Auvergne-Rhône-Alpes
- Department: Ain
- Arrondissement: Bourg-en-Bresse
- Canton: Vonnas
- Intercommunality: Veyle

Government
  - Mayor (2026–32): Guillaume Agaty
- Area^{1}: 11.48 km^{2} (4.43 sq mi)
- Elevation: 210 m (690 ft)
- Highest elevation: 224 m (735 ft)
- Lowest elevation: 179 m (587 ft)
- Population (2023): 889
  - Density: 77.4/km^{2} (201/sq mi)
- Time zone: UTC+01:00 (CET)
  - Summer (DST): UTC+02:00 (CEST)
- INSEE/Postal code: 01046 /01290
- Website: https://biziat.fr/
- ^{1} French Land Register data, which excludes lakes, ponds, glaciers > 1 km^{2} (0.386 sq mi or 247 acres) and river estuaries.

Biziat (French pronunciation: [bizja]) is a commune in the Ain department in central-eastern France.

== Geography ==
The Veyle forms most of the commune's northeastern border.

== Population ==
Historical population
| Year | Pop. | ±% p.a. |
|---|---|---|
| 1968 | 518 | — |
| 1975 | 533 | +0.41% |
| 1982 | 561 | +0.73% |
| 1990 | 574 | +0.29% |
| 1999 | 641 | +1.23% |
| 2007 | 765 | +2.24% |
| 2012 | 817 | +1.32% |
| 2017 | 876 | +1.40% |
| 2023 | 889 | +0.25% |
Source: INSEE

== See also ==
- Communes of the Ain department
