= Mézériat =

Commune in Auvergne-Rhône-Alpes, France

- Commune
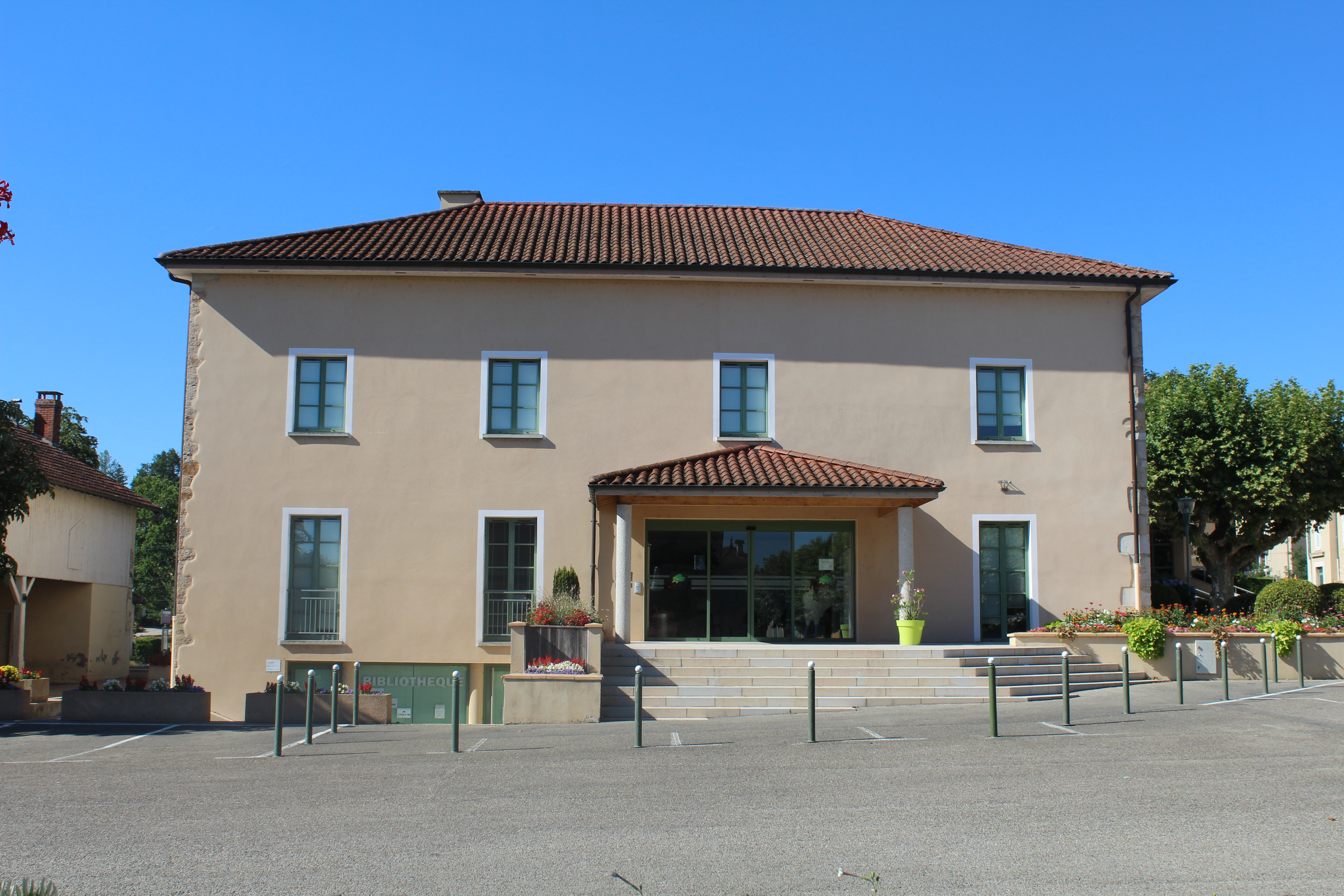
- Town hall
- Location of Mézériat
- Location within France Location within Auvergne-Rhône-Alpes
- Coordinates: 46°14′07″N 5°02′52″E
- Country: France
- Region: Auvergne-Rhône-Alpes
- Department: Ain
- Arrondissement: Bourg-en-Bresse
- Canton: Vonnas
- Intercommunality: Veyle

Government
  - Mayor (2026–32): Guy Dupuit
- Area^{1}: 19.17 km^{2} (7.40 sq mi)
- Highest elevation: 223 m (732 ft)
- Lowest elevation: 189 m (620 ft)
- Population (2023): 2,172
  - Density: 113.3/km^{2} (293.5/sq mi)
- Time zone: UTC+01:00 (CET)
  - Summer (DST): UTC+02:00 (CEST)
- INSEE/Postal code: 01246 /01660
- ^{1} French Land Register data, which excludes lakes, ponds, glaciers > 1 km^{2} (0.386 sq mi or 247 acres) and river estuaries.

Mézériat (French pronunciation: [mezeʁja]; Arpitan: Mesèriê) is a commune in the Ain department in eastern France.

== Geography ==
The Veyle flows west through the southern part of the commune, crosses the village, then flows southwest and forms part of the commune's southwestern border. Mézériat station has rail connections to Bourg-en-Bresse, Ambérieu-en-Bugey and Mâcon.

== Population ==
Historical population

Year	Pop.	±% p.a.
1793	701	—
1800	1,041	+5.81%
1806	1,093	+0.82%
1821	1,175	+0.48%
1831	1,208	+0.28%
1836	1,234	+0.43%
1841	1,209	−0.41%
1846	1,306	+1.56%
1851	1,287	−0.29%
1856	1,306	+0.29%
1861	1,301	−0.08%
1866	1,347	+0.70%
1872	1,354	+0.09%
1876	1,405	+0.93%
1881	1,425	+0.28%
1886	1,402	−0.32%
1891	1,416	+0.20%
1896	1,422	+0.08%
1901	1,427	+0.07%

Year	Pop.	±% p.a.
1906	1,420	−0.10%
1911	1,441	+0.29%
1921	1,313	−0.93%
1926	1,317	+0.06%
1931	1,305	−0.18%
1936	1,353	+0.73%
1946	1,298	−0.41%
1954	1,239	−0.58%
1962	1,272	+0.33%
1968	1,298	+0.34%
1975	1,660	+3.58%
1982	1,879	+1.79%
1990	1,995	+0.75%
1999	1,911	−0.48%
2007	2,018	+0.68%
2012	2,111	+0.91%
2017	2,172	+0.57%
2023	2,172	+0.00%

Source: EHESS and INSEE (1968-2023)

== See also ==
- Communes of the Ain department
