= Vonnas station =

Railway station in Vonnas, France

Coordinates: 46°13′38″N 4°59′30″E

Vonnas
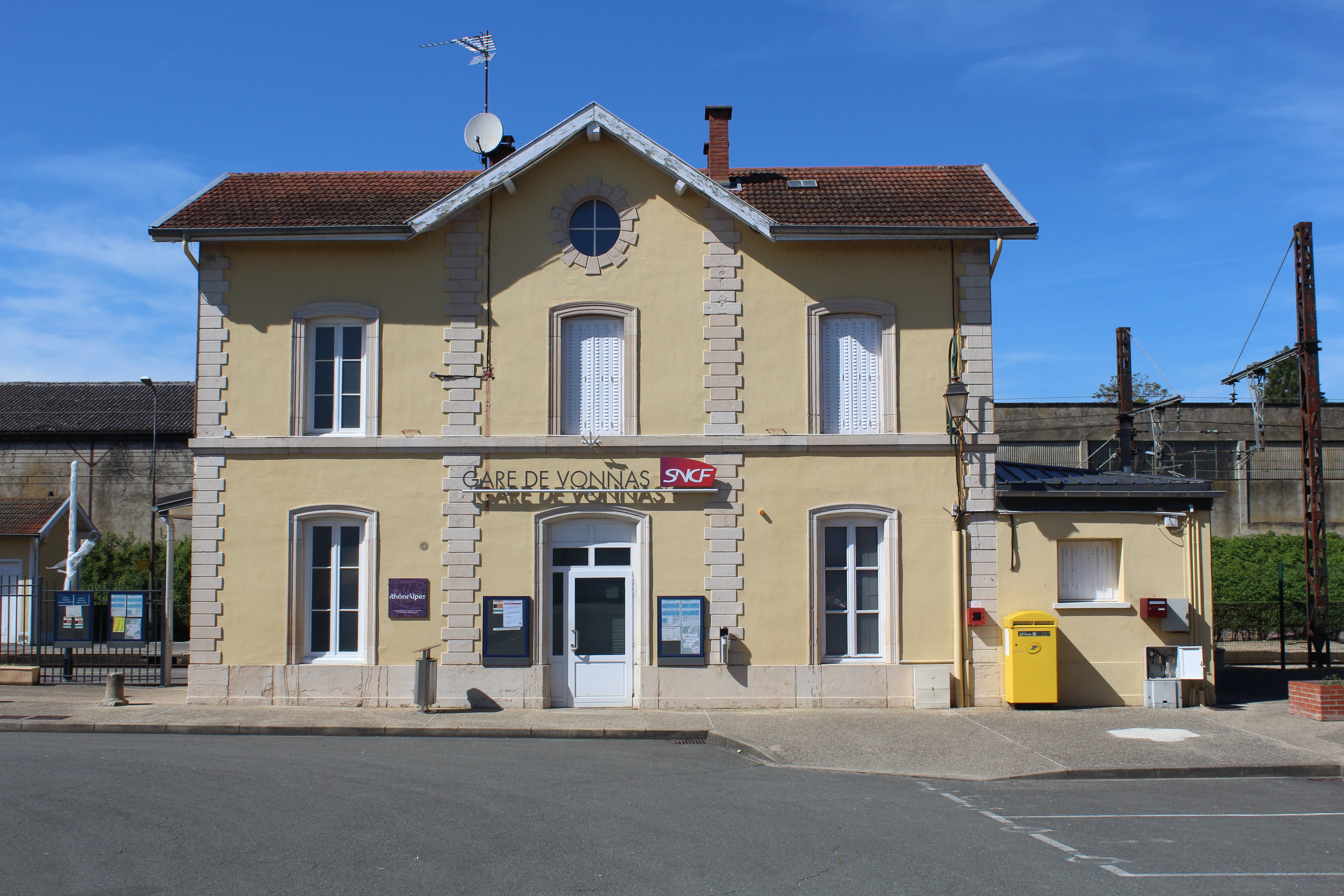
- Passenger building and station entrance.

General information
- Location: Route de Luponas; 01540 Vonnas; Ain; France
- Elevation: 192 m (630 ft)
- Owner: SNCF
- Operator: SNCF
- Line: Mâcon-Ambérieu railway
- Distance: 16.950 km
- Platforms: 2
- Tracks: 2 (+ service tracks)

History
- Opened: 6 June 1857

Passengers
- 2019: 91,327

Services
Preceding station	TER Auvergne-Rhône-Alpes	Following station
Pont-de-Veyle towards Mâcon	30	Mézériat towards Ambérieu
Location

Vonnas station (French: Gare de Vonnas) is a French railway station serving the commune of Vonnas, Ain department in the Auvergne-Rhône-Alpes region. It is located at kilometric point (KP) 16.950 on the Mâcon-Ambérieu railway.

Put into service by the Compagnie du chemin de fer de Lyon à la Méditerranée (LM) in 1857, the station would later become part of the Compagnie des chemins de fer de Paris à Lyon et à la Méditerranée's (PLM) network.

As of 2020, the station is owned and operated by the SNCF and served by TER Auvergne-Rhône-Alpes trains.

== History ==
Vonnas station was opened on 6 June 1857 by the Compagnie du chemin de fer de Lyon à la Méditerranée (LM), along with the opening of a 34 km section of track from Bourg on the left bank of the Saône. Trains initially stopped on the bank of the river as a result of delays in viaduct construction. A boat service enable passengers to reach their destination in roughly 30 minutes. The completion of the viaduct occurred on 20 July 1857, enabling trains to reach their final destination.

In 1911, the station became part of the Compagnie des chemins de fer de Paris à Lyon et à la Méditerranée (PLM), network of stations and stops.

The station remained it status of a passenger station during the 20th century, with station installations undergoing renovations in 2012 as part of a regional program to renovate stations and halts.

In 2019, the SNCF estimated that 91,327 passengers traveled through the station.

== Services ==
=== Passenger services ===
The SNCF station is composed of a passenger building, equipped with ticket-windows and a passenger waiting room. The station building is open from Monday to Friday, excluding holidays, while platforms are accessible seven-days per week from the arrival of the first train to the departure of the last one.

=== Train services ===
As of 2020, the station is served by TER Auvergne-Rhône-Alpes line 30 serves between Mâcon-Ville station and Ambérieu station.

=== Intermodality ===
The station is equipped with space for bicycle storage and vehicle parking.

In addition to train services, Vonnas station is also served by TER buses between Mâcon and Bourg-en-Bresse.

Station installations

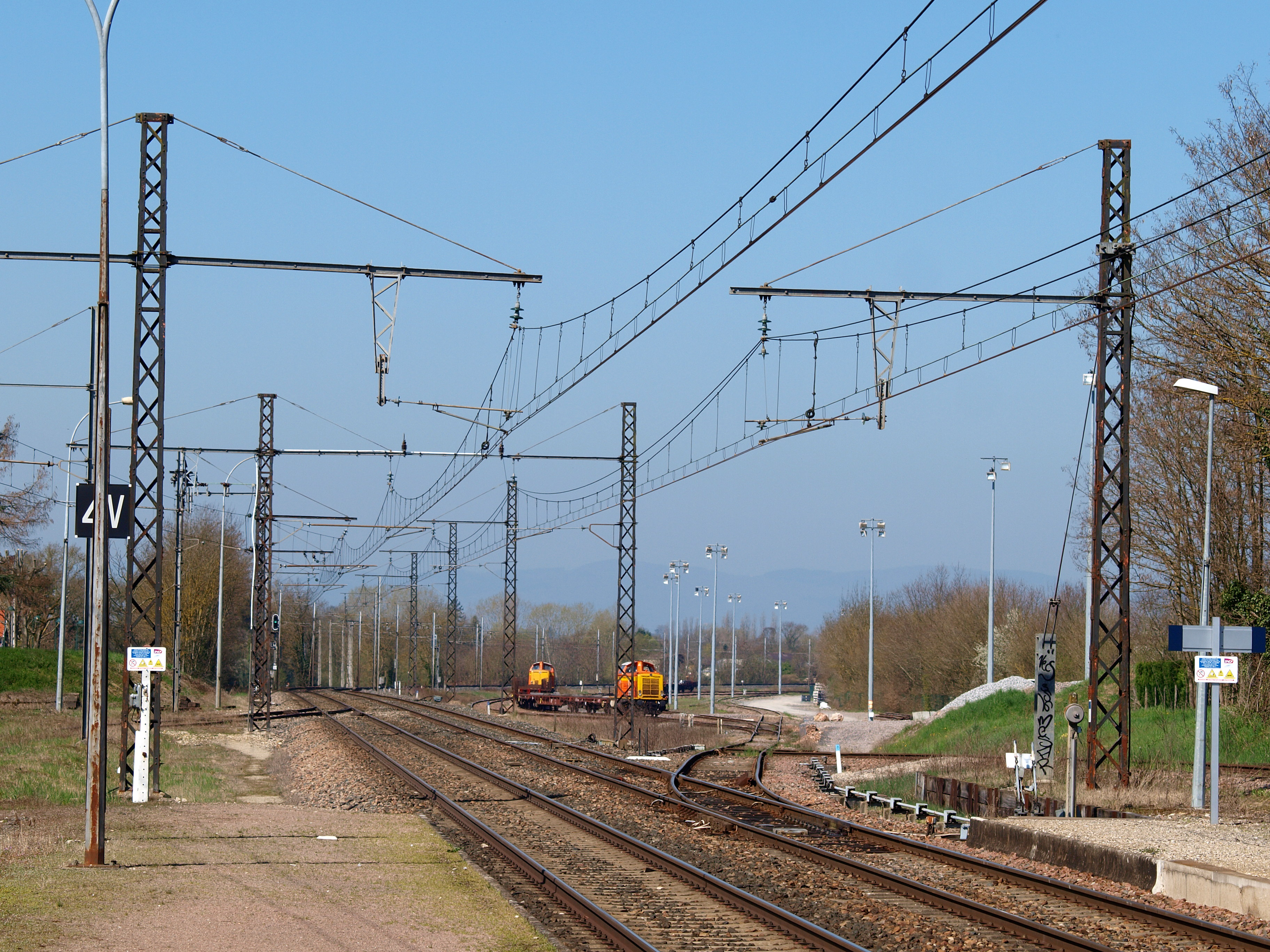
Service tracks.

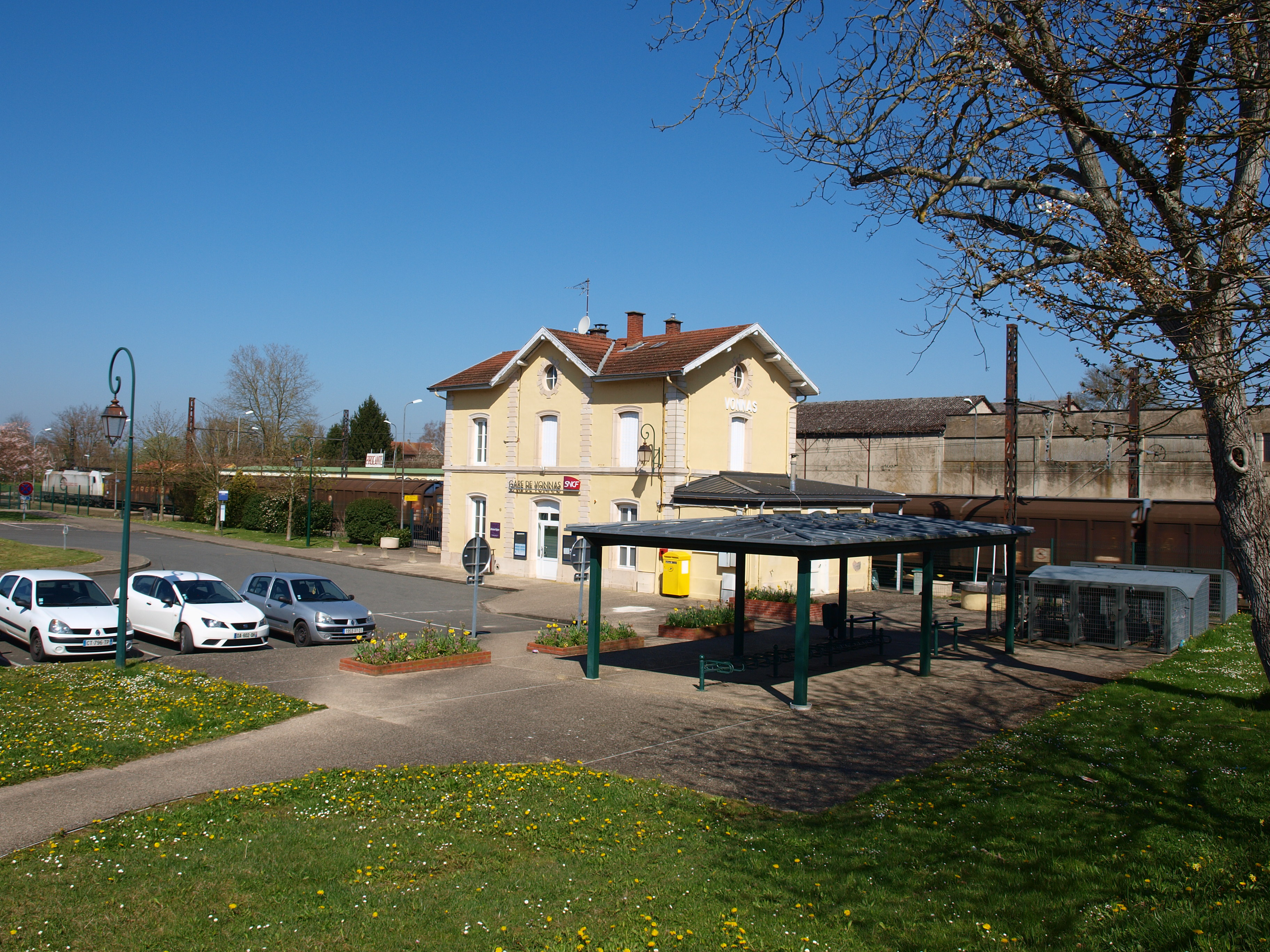
Parking and bike storage.

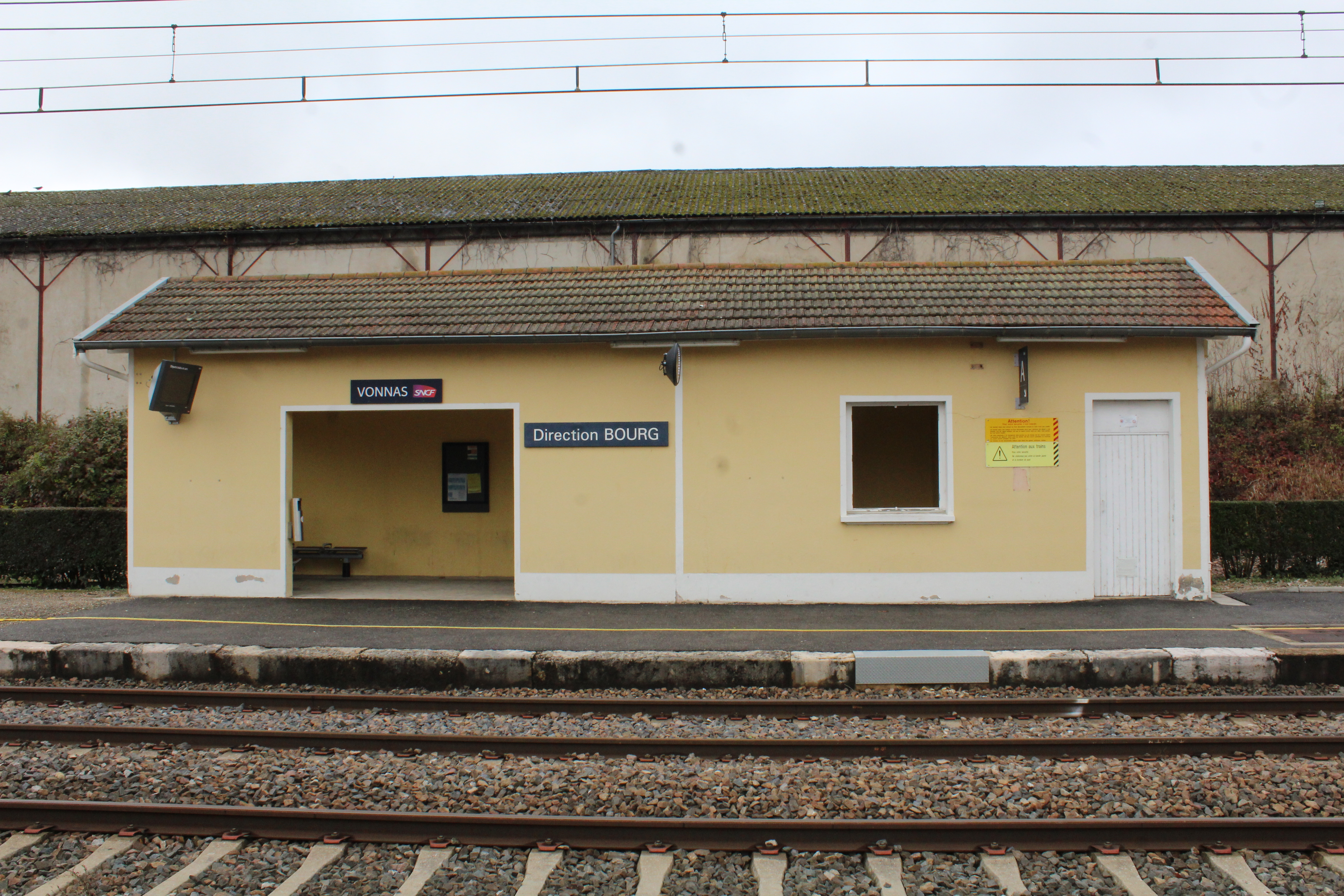
Platform shelter.

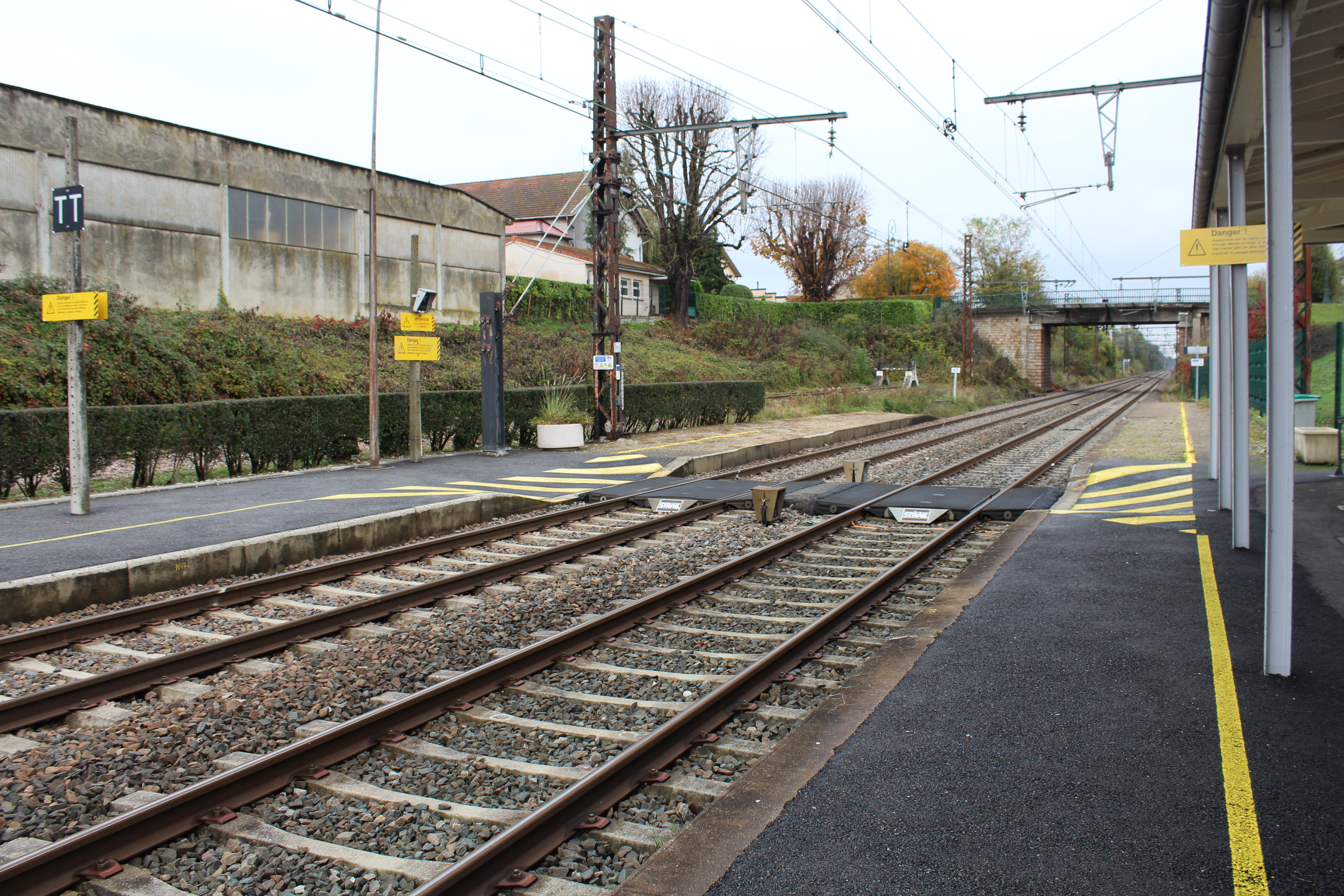
Passenger crossing.

== See also ==
- List of SNCF stations in Auvergne-Rhône-Alpes
