= Chaveyriat =

Commune in Auvergne-Rhône-Alpes, France

- Commune
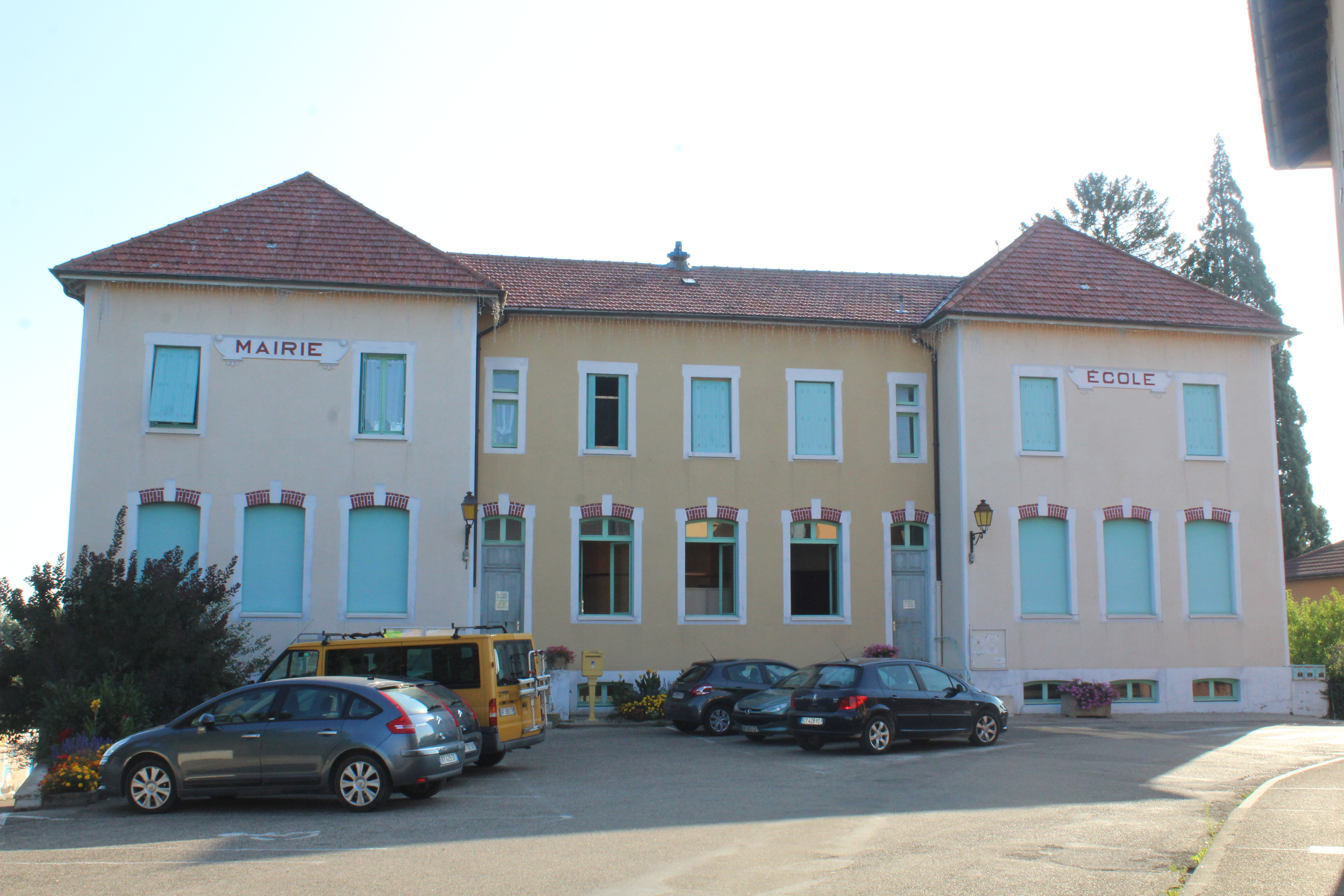
- Town hall and school
- Location of Chaveyriat
- Location within France Location within Auvergne-Rhône-Alpes
- Coordinates: 46°11′00″N 5°04′00″E
- Country: France
- Region: Auvergne-Rhône-Alpes
- Department: Ain
- Arrondissement: Bourg-en-Bresse
- Canton: Vonnas
- Intercommunality: Veyle

Government
  - Mayor (2026–32): Claude Jacquet
- Area^{1}: 16.87 km^{2} (6.51 sq mi)
- Elevation: 245 m (804 ft)
- Highest elevation: 260 m (850 ft)
- Lowest elevation: 188 m (617 ft)
- Population (2023): 1,078
  - Density: 63.90/km^{2} (165.5/sq mi)
- Time zone: UTC+01:00 (CET)
  - Summer (DST): UTC+02:00 (CEST)
- INSEE/Postal code: 01096 /01660
- ^{1} French Land Register data, which excludes lakes, ponds, glaciers > 1 km^{2} (0.386 sq mi or 247 acres) and river estuaries.

Chaveyriat (French pronunciation: [ʃaveʁja]) is a commune in the Ain department in eastern France. It sits north of the D396 road, and is located 7 km north east of Neuville-les-Dames and 13 km west of Bourg-en-Bresse.

The romanesque parish church is dedicated to St John the Baptist.

== History ==
The first mention of the town dates from 933 under the name of Cavariaco in the collection of Charters of Cluny.

The castle of Chaveyriat was destroyed in 1376 by the troops of the Sire de Beaujeu, it had been the home of Hugues de Marchant, then, successively, was held by the families of Columbus, Cheminant, Varax, de la Cley.

In 1601, after the Treaty of Lyons, Chaveyriat became part of the Burgundy province of France.

Between 1790 and 1795, it became a municipality in the canton of Châtillon-les-Dombes.

== Population ==
Historical population
Year	Pop.	±% p.a.
1968	616	—
1975	567	−1.18%
1982	598	+0.76%
1990	766	+3.14%
1999	810	+0.62%
2007	896	+1.27%
2012	959	+1.37%
2017	1,008	+1.00%
2023	1,078	+1.13%
Source: INSEE

== See also ==
- Communes of the Ain department
