= Vonnas =

Commune in Auvergne-Rhône-Alpes, France

- Commune
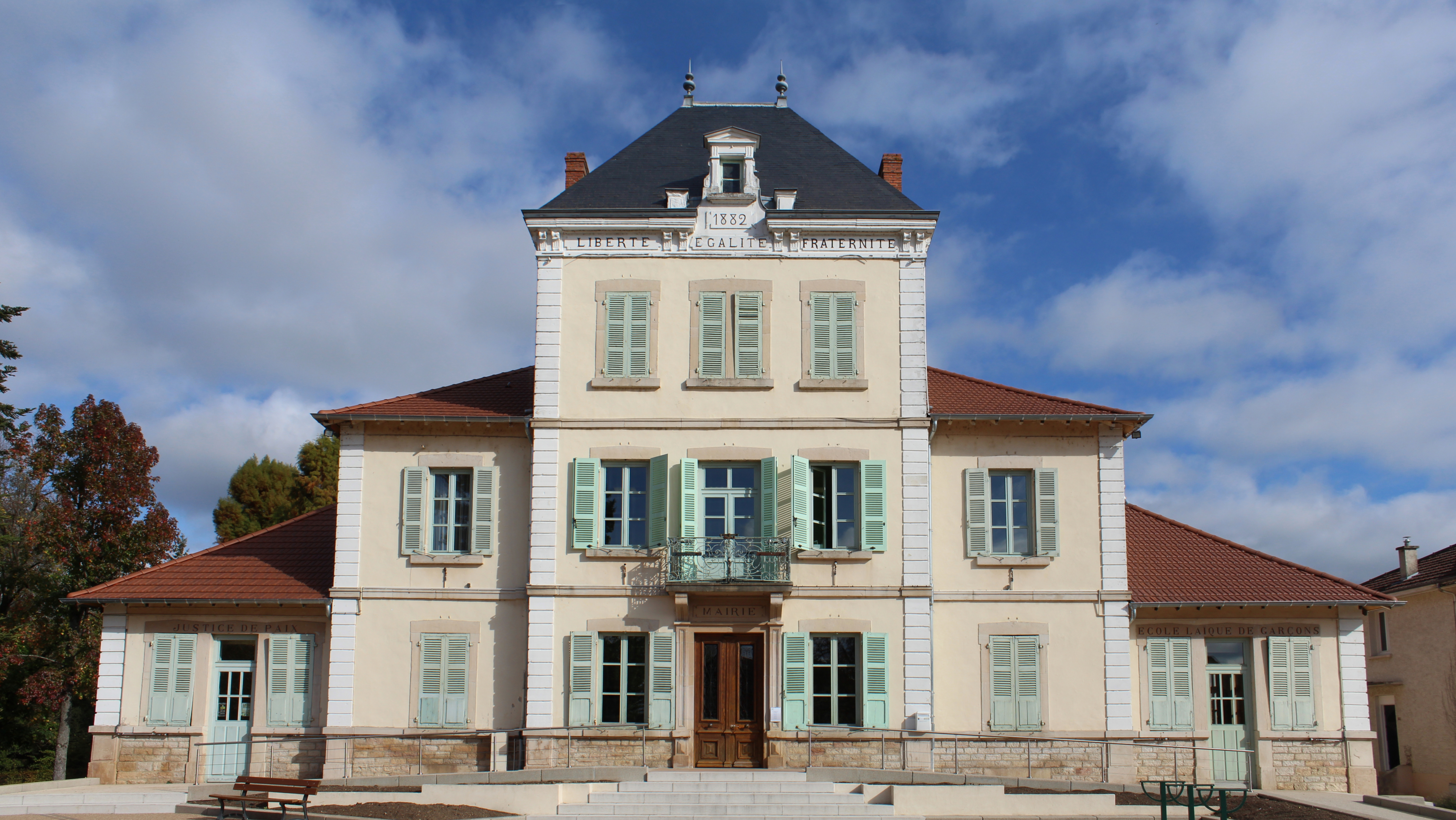
- Town hall

- Coat of arms
- Location of Vonnas
- Location within France Location within Auvergne-Rhône-Alpes
- Coordinates: 46°13′01″N 4°59′24″E
- Country: France
- Region: Auvergne-Rhône-Alpes
- Department: Ain
- Arrondissement: Bourg-en-Bresse
- Canton: Vonnas
- Intercommunality: Veyle

Government
  - Mayor (2020–2026): Alain Givord
- Area^{1}: 17.81 km^{2} (6.88 sq mi)
- Elevation: 190 m (620 ft)
- Highest elevation: 253 m (830 ft)
- Lowest elevation: 183 m (600 ft)
- Population (2023): 3,255
  - Density: 182.8/km^{2} (473.4/sq mi)
- Demonym(s): Vonnassiens, Vonnassiennes
- Time zone: UTC+01:00 (CET)
  - Summer (DST): UTC+02:00 (CEST)
- INSEE/Postal code: 01457 /01540
- ^{1} French Land Register data, which excludes lakes, ponds, glaciers > 1 km^{2} (0.386 sq mi or 247 acres) and river estuaries.

Vonnas (French pronunciation: [vɔna]; Arpitan: Vonâs) is a commune in the Ain department in eastern France.

Vonnas has a famous restaurant with two stars in the Guide Michelin, the Hotel Restaurant Georges Blanc.

== Geography ==
The Veyle forms part of the commune's northeastern border, flows west through the northern part of the commune, then forms part of its northwestern border. Vonnas station has rail connections to Bourg-en-Bresse, Ambérieu-en-Bugey and Mâcon.

== Population ==
Historical population
Year	Pop.	±% p.a.
1968	1,835	—
1975	2,144	+2.25%
1982	2,505	+2.25%
1990	2,381	−0.63%
1999	2,422	+0.19%
2007	2,673	+1.24%
2012	2,850	+1.29%
2017	2,961	+0.77%
2023	3,255	+1.59%
Source: INSEE

== See also ==
- Communes of the Ain department
