= Chanoz-Châtenay =

Commune in Auvergne-Rhône-Alpes, France

Chanoz-Châtenay Châno-Châtenê (Arpitan)
- Commune
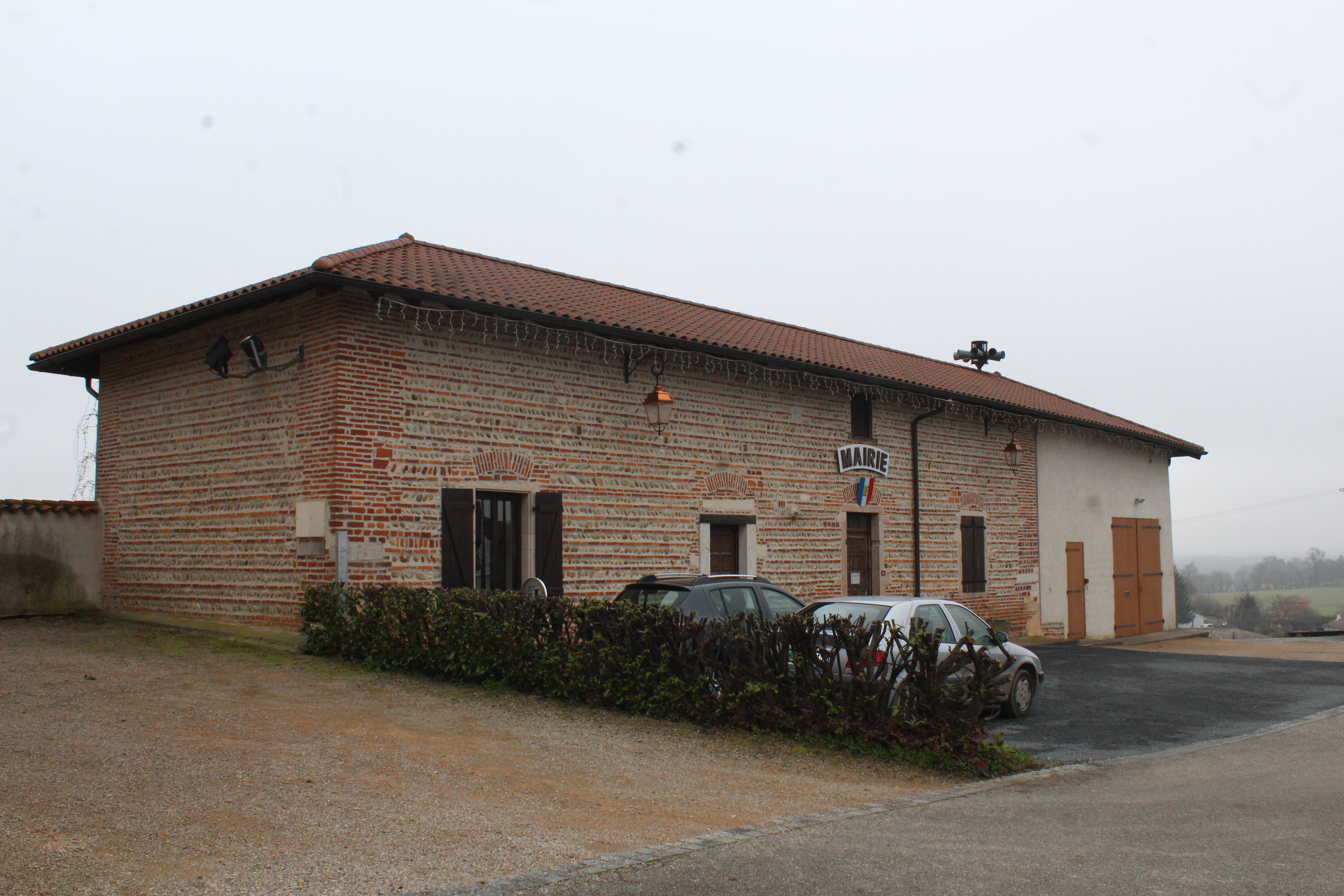
- Town hall
- Location of Chanoz-Châtenay
- Location within France Location within Auvergne-Rhône-Alpes
- Coordinates: 46°11′00″N 5°02′00″E
- Country: France
- Region: Auvergne-Rhône-Alpes
- Department: Ain
- Arrondissement: Bourg-en-Bresse
- Canton: Vonnas
- Intercommunality: Veyle

Government
  - Mayor (2026–32): Olivier Morandat
- Area^{1}: 13.42 km^{2} (5.18 sq mi)
- Elevation: 247 m (810 ft)
- Highest elevation: 268 m (879 ft)
- Lowest elevation: 194 m (636 ft)
- Population (2023): 989
  - Density: 73.7/km^{2} (191/sq mi)
- Time zone: UTC+01:00 (CET)
  - Summer (DST): UTC+02:00 (CEST)
- INSEE/Postal code: 01084 /01400
- ^{1} French Land Register data, which excludes lakes, ponds, glaciers > 1 km^{2} (0.386 sq mi or 247 acres) and river estuaries.

Chanoz-Châtenay (French pronunciation: [ʃano ʃatnɛ]; Arpitan: Châno-Châtenê [ˈθaː.no θɔ.tə.ˈna]) is a commune in the Ain department in eastern France.

== Population ==
Historical population
Year	Pop.	±% p.a.
1968	475	—
1975	451	−0.74%
1982	453	+0.06%
1990	476	+0.62%
1999	492	+0.37%
2007	652	+3.58%
2012	732	+2.34%
2017	844	+2.89%
2023	989	+2.68%
Source: INSEE

== See also ==
- Communes of the Ain department
