= Mézériat station =

Railway station in Mézériat, France

Coordinates: 46.2350°N 5.0464°E

Mézériat
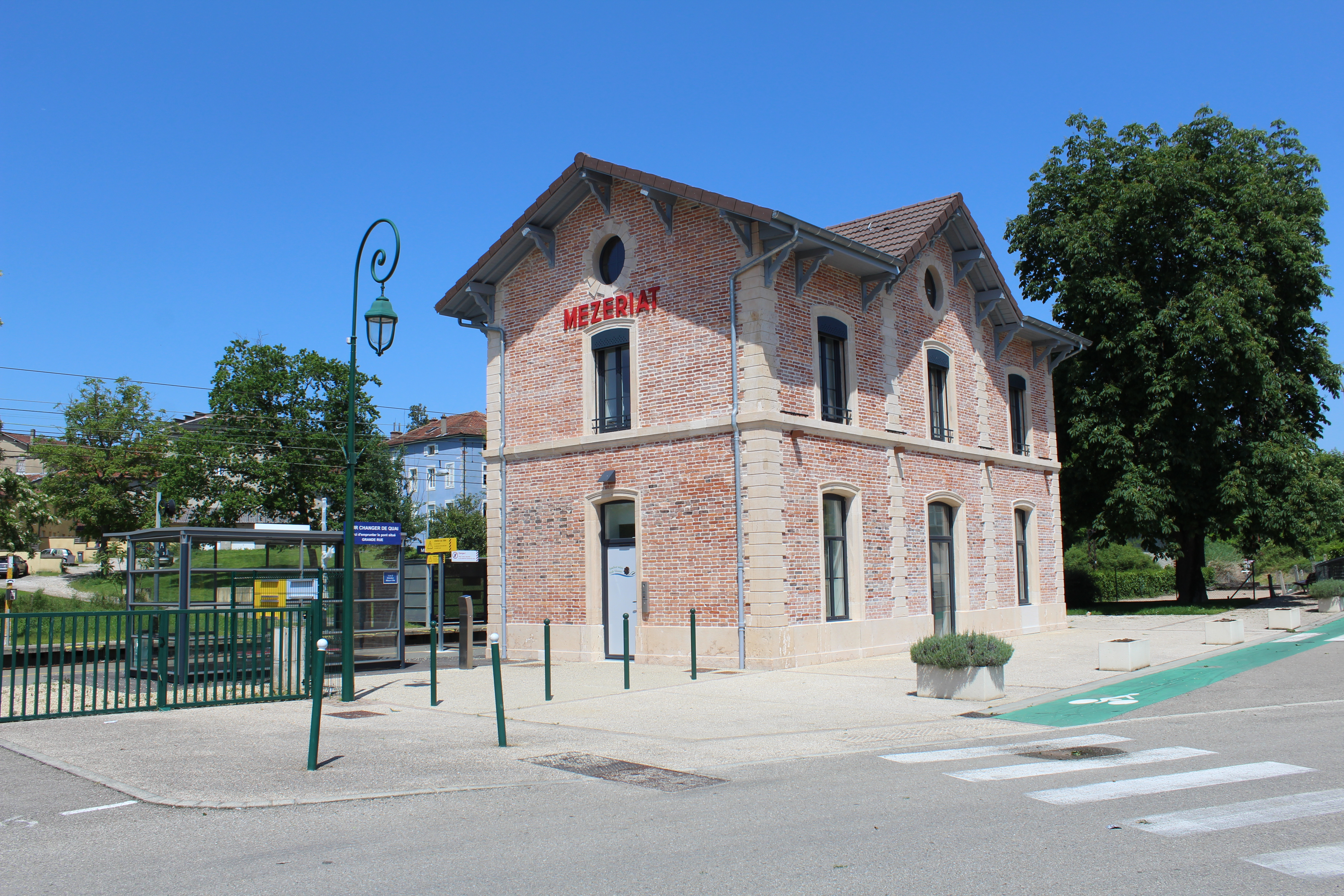
- Historic passenger building with the entrance to the SNCF station to the left.

General information
- Location: Place de la Gare; 01660 Mézériat; Ain; France
- Elevation: 197 m (646 ft)
- Owner: SNCF
- Operator: SNCF
- Line: Mâcon—Ambérieu railway
- Distance: 21.476 km
- Platforms: 2
- Tracks: 2

Other information
- Website: Station website

History
- Opened: 6 June 1857

Passengers
- 2019: 41,775

Services
Preceding station	TER Auvergne-Rhône-Alpes	Following station
Vonnas towards Mâcon	30	Polliat towards Ambérieu
Location

Mézériat station (French: Gare de Mézériat) is a railway station located in the commune of Mézériat, Ain department in the Auvergne-Rhône-Alpes region of France. It is located at kilometric point (KP) 21.476 on the Mâcon—Ambérieu railway, between the stations of Vonnas and Polliat.

As of 2020, the station is owned and operated by the SNCF and served by TER Auvergne-Rhône-Alpes trains.

== History ==
Mézériat station was put into service on 6 June 1857 by the Compagnie du chemin de fer de Lyon à la Méditerranée (LM), along with the opening of 34 km of railway from Bourg-en-Bresse along the left bank of the Saône river. Due to delays in the construction of a viaduct to cross the river, a boat service was organized to transport passengers across the water, with an additional journey time of 30 minutes. The completion of the viaduct, permitted the continuation of the line after 20 July 1857.

In 1911, Mézériat station became part of the railway network operated by the Compagnie des chemins de fer de Paris à Lyon et à la Méditerranée (PLM). The station was originally equipped to receive and expedite private dispatches, but was soon opened to complete freight services, with the exclusion of horses in stable wagons and automobiles.

During the course of 2012, the station underwent renovations as part of a region-wide program to improve the quality of railway stations.

In 2019, the SNCF estimated that 41,775 passengers traveled through the station.

=== Railway history ===
The old passenger building, no longer used by the SNCF, was bought and renovated by the commune in 2014. The total cost of the project was 205,843 euros, with funding support from the Departmental Council.

== Services ==
=== Passenger services ===
Classified as a PANG (point d'accès non géré), the station is unstaffed and equipped with automatic ticket dispensers.

Passage between the two platforms is possible via the nearby road-overpass.

=== Train services ===
As of 2020, the station is served by the following services:

- Regional services (TER Auvergne-Rhône-Alpes 30) Mâcon ... Bourge-en-Bresse ... Ambérieu.

=== Intermodality ===
In addition to a parking lot for passengers, the station is equipped with secure bicycle storage facilities. The station is also served by TER buses between Mâcon and Bourg-en-Bresse.

Station installations.

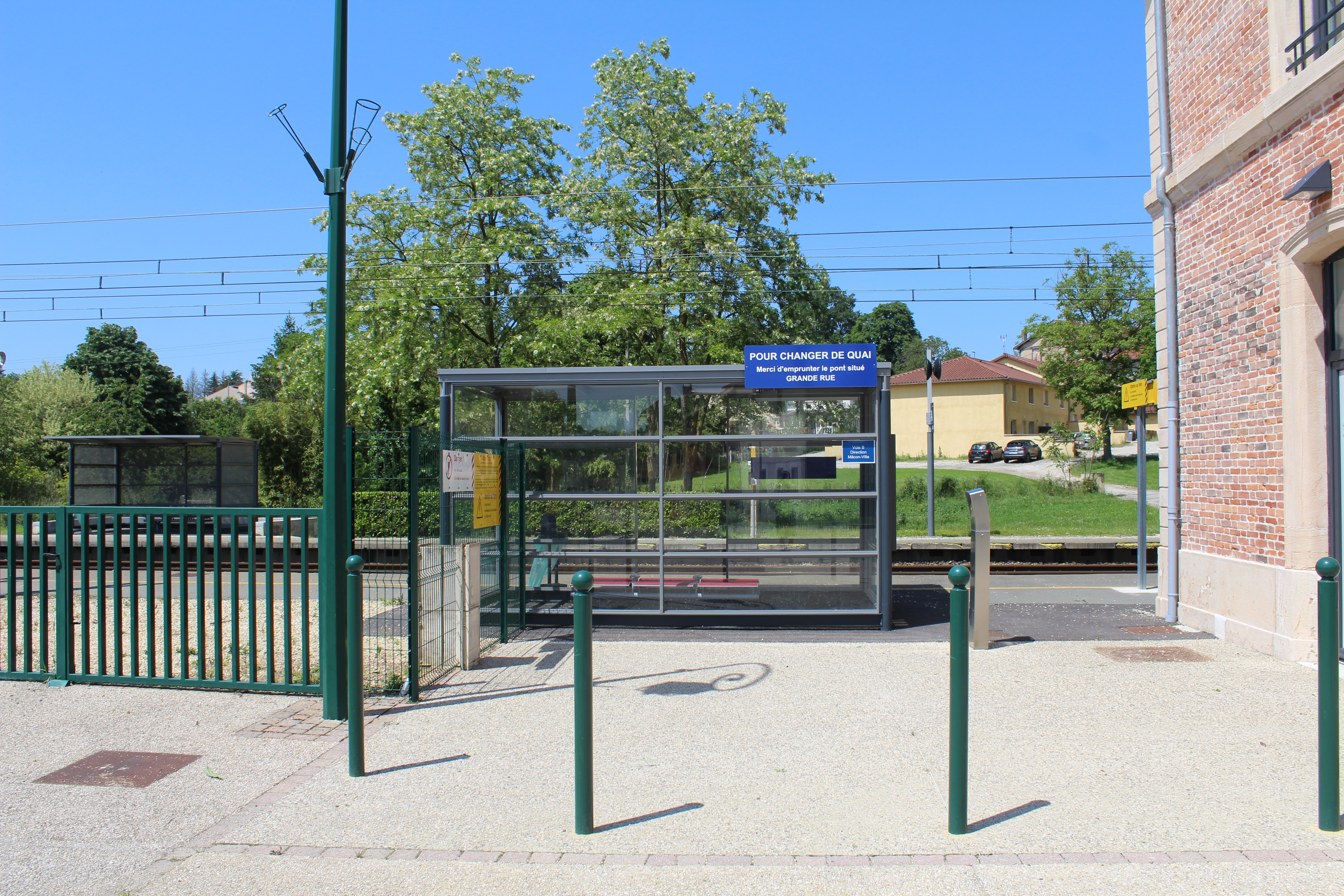
Platform shelter.

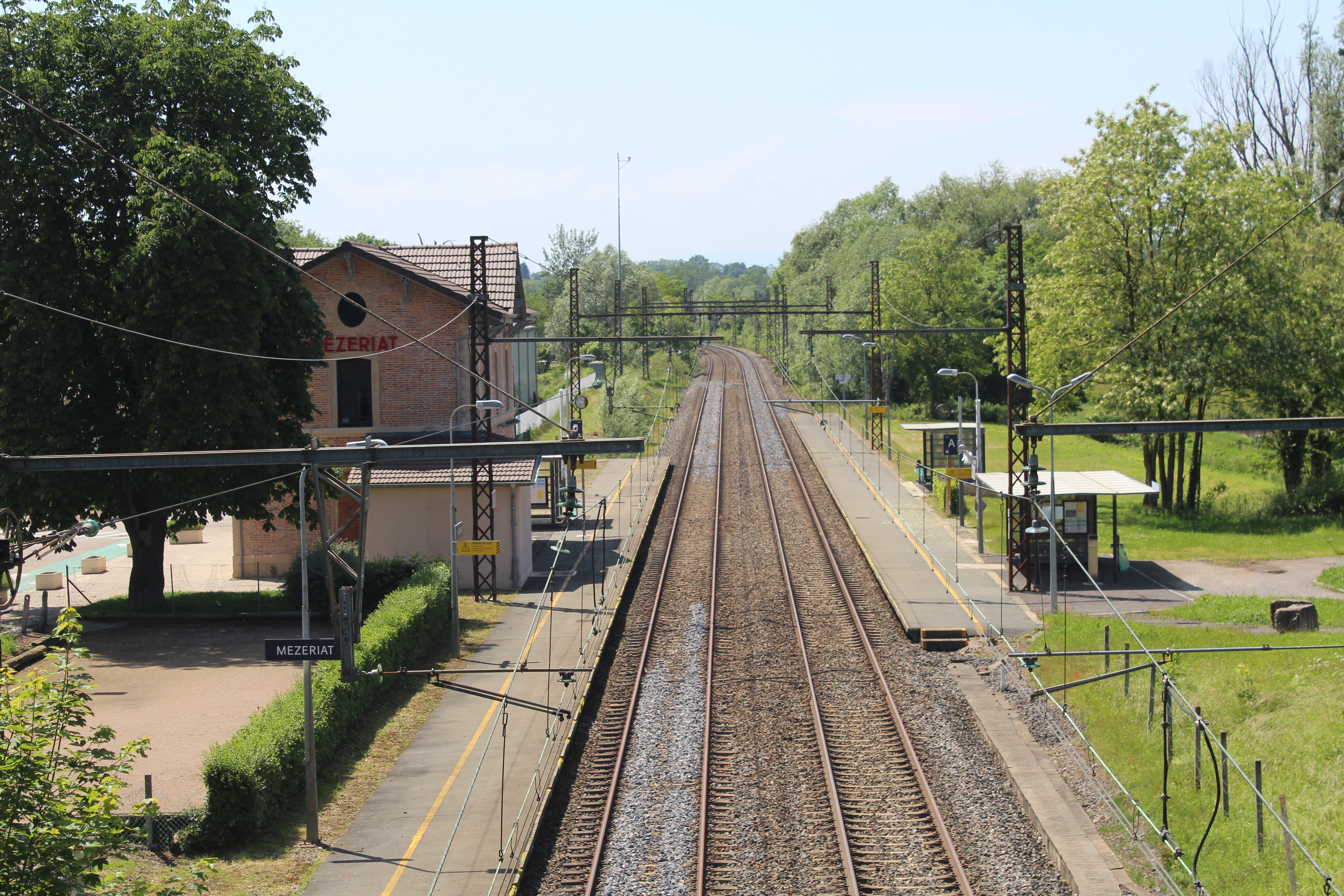
View of the station and platforms.

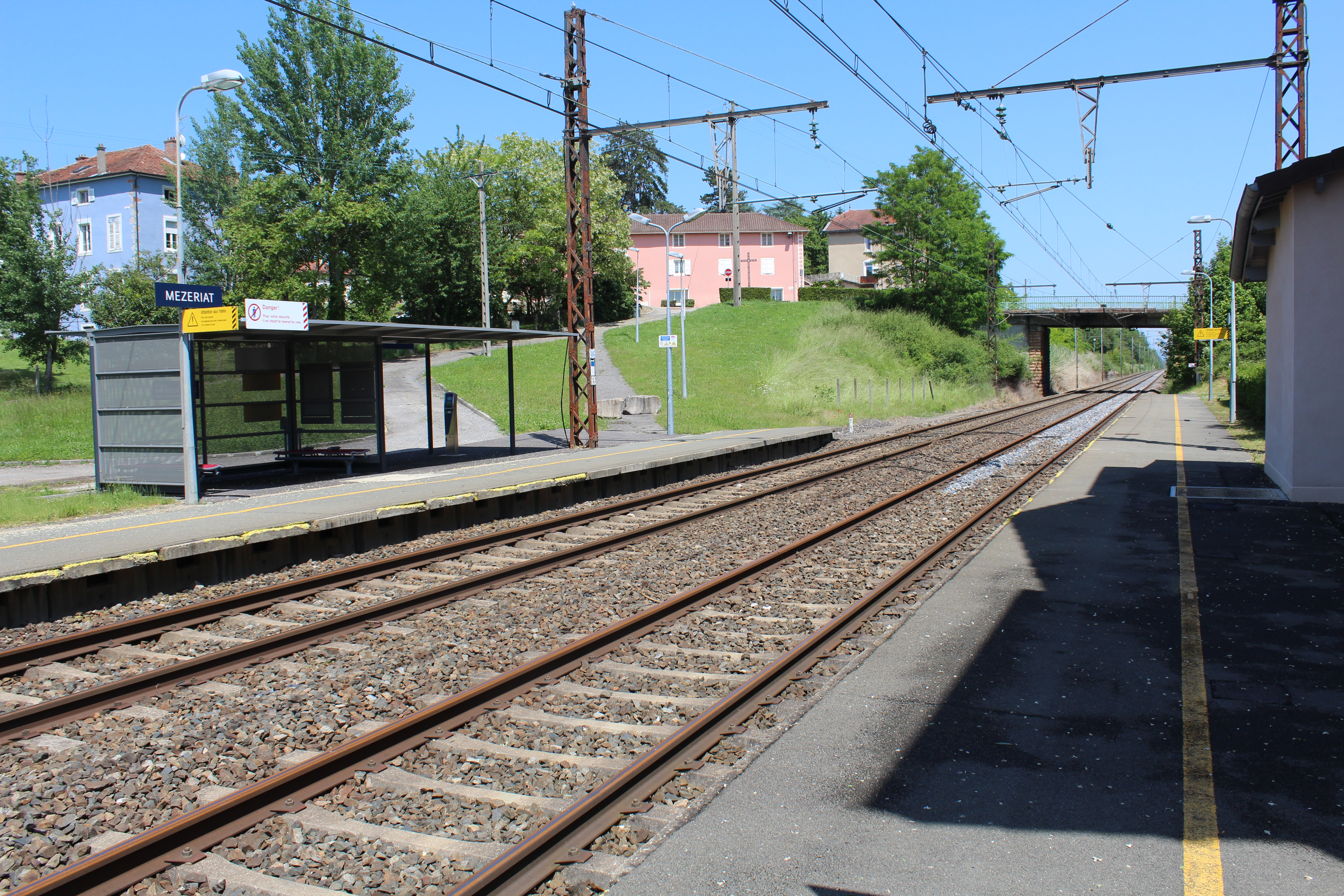
To the right of the road overpass.

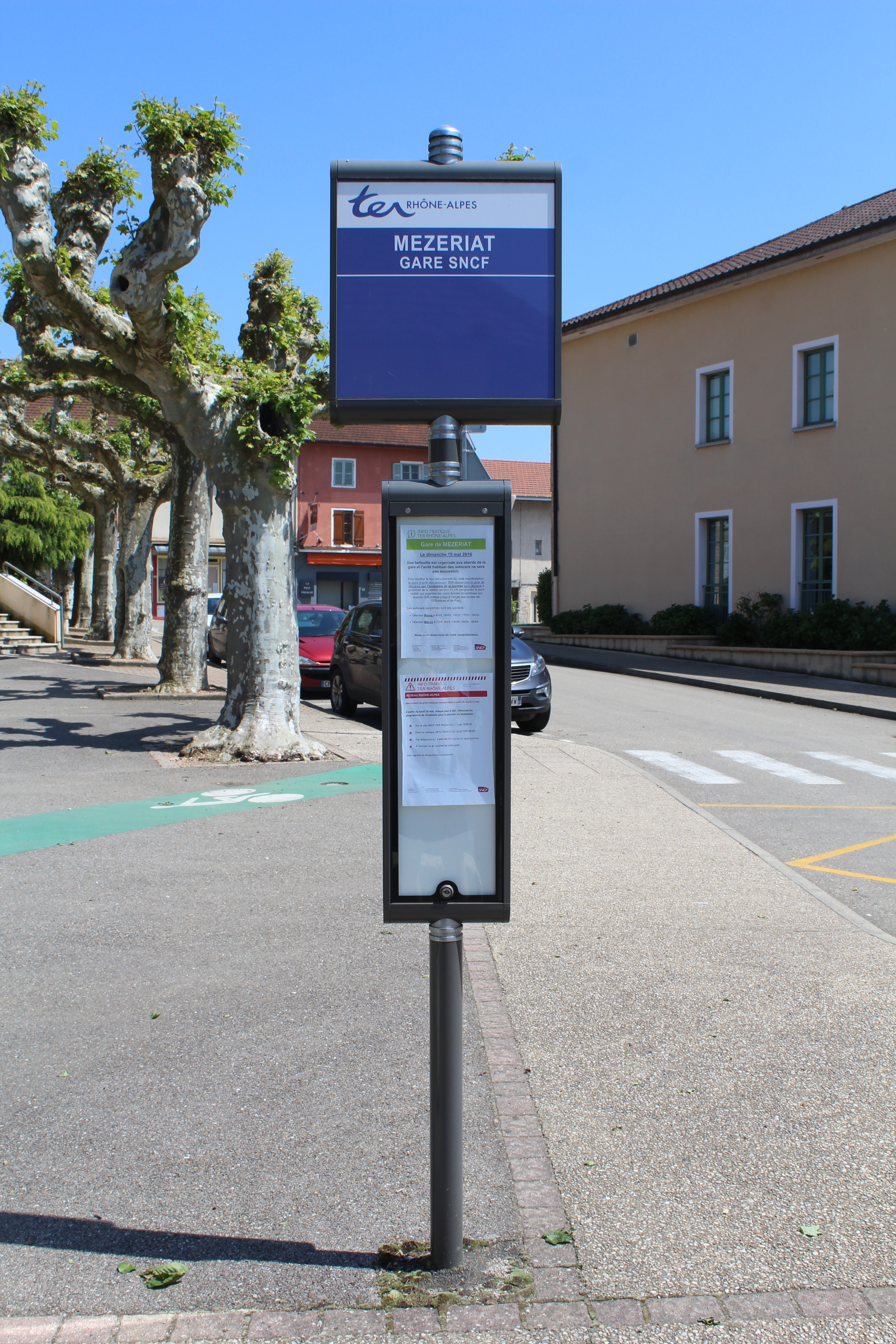
TER Bus Stop.

== See also ==
- List of SNCF stations in Auvergne-Rhône-Alpes
