= Saint-Cyr-sur-Menthon =

Commune in Auvergne-Rhône-Alpes, France

- Commune
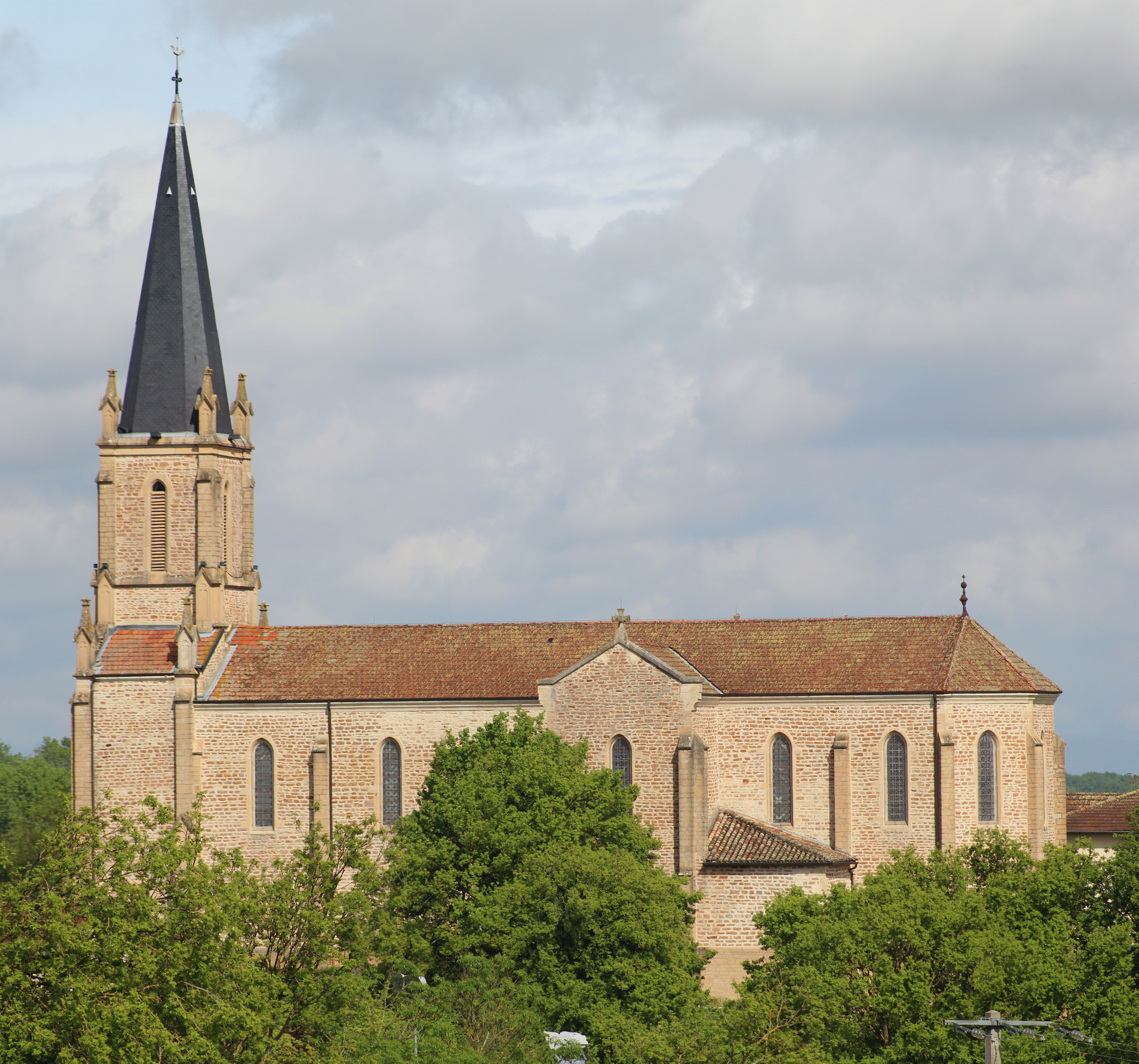

- Coat of arms
- Location of Saint-Cyr-sur-Menthon
- Location within France Location within Auvergne-Rhône-Alpes
- Coordinates: 46°16′35″N 4°58′24″E
- Country: France
- Region: Auvergne-Rhône-Alpes
- Department: Ain
- Arrondissement: Bourg-en-Bresse
- Canton: Vonnas
- Intercommunality: CC de la Veyle

Government
  - Mayor (2026–32): Karine Palle
- Area^{1}: 16.93 km^{2} (6.54 sq mi)
- Elevation: 180 m (590 ft)
- Highest elevation: 217 m (712 ft)
- Lowest elevation: 181 m (594 ft)
- Population (2023): 1,890
  - Density: 112/km^{2} (289/sq mi)
- Time zone: UTC+01:00 (CET)
  - Summer (DST): UTC+02:00 (CEST)
- INSEE/Postal code: 01343 /01380
- ^{1} French Land Register data, which excludes lakes, ponds, glaciers > 1 km^{2} (0.386 sq mi or 247 acres) and river estuaries.

Saint-Cyr-sur-Menthon (French pronunciation: [sɛ̃ siʁ syʁ mɑ̃tɔ̃]; Arpitan: Sent-Ciro) is a commune in the Ain department in eastern France.

== Population ==
Historical population
Year	Pop.	±% p.a.
1968	809	—
1975	822	+0.23%
1982	983	+2.59%
1990	1,243	+2.98%
1999	1,314	+0.62%
2007	1,544	+2.04%
2012	1,712	+2.09%
2017	1,776	+0.74%
2023	1,890	+1.04%
Source: INSEE

== See also ==
- Communes of the Ain department
