= Canton of Vonnas =

Canton of France

Coordinates: 46.22°N 4.99°E

- Canton
- Situation of the canton of Vonnas in the department of Ain
- Country: France
- Region: Auvergne-Rhône-Alpes
- Department: Ain
- No. of communes: {{{nbcomm}}}
- Population (2023): 25,204
- INSEE code: 0123

The canton of Vonnas is an administrative division of the Ain department, in eastern France. It was created at the French canton reorganisation which came into effect in March 2015. Its seat is in Vonnas.

It consists of the following communes:

1. Bey
2. Biziat
3. Chanoz-Châtenay
4. Chaveyriat
5. Cormoranche-sur-Saône
6. Crottet
7. Cruzilles-lès-Mépillat
8. Grièges
9. Laiz
10. Mézériat
11. Perrex
12. Pont-de-Veyle
13. Saint-André-d'Huiriat
14. Saint-Cyr-sur-Menthon
15. Saint-Genis-sur-Menthon
16. Saint-Jean-sur-Veyle
17. Saint-Julien-sur-Veyle
18. Saint-Laurent-sur-Saône
19. Vonnas
