= Bey, Ain =

Commune in Auvergne-Rhône-Alpes, France

Bey
- Commune
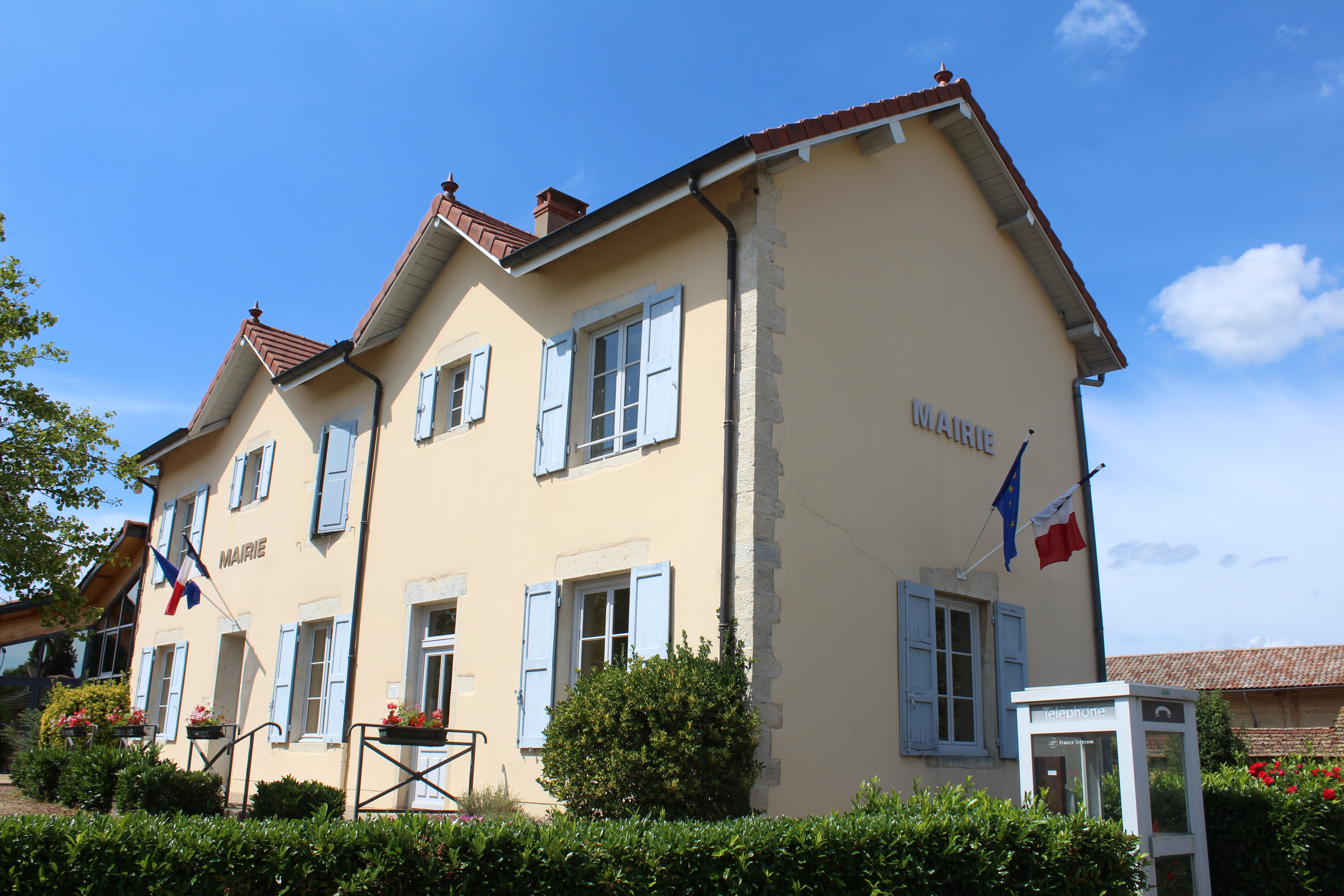
- Town hall
- Location of Bey
- Location within France Location within Auvergne-Rhône-Alpes
- Coordinates: 46°13′13″N 4°50′48″E
- Country: France
- Region: Auvergne-Rhône-Alpes
- Department: Ain
- Arrondissement: Bourg-en-Bresse
- Canton: Vonnas
- Intercommunality: Veyle

Government
  - Mayor (2026–32): Olivier Metral
- Area^{1}: 2.77 km^{2} (1.07 sq mi)
- Elevation: 210 m (690 ft)
- Highest elevation: 213 m (699 ft)
- Lowest elevation: 175 m (574 ft)
- Population (2023): 286
  - Density: 103/km^{2} (267/sq mi)
- Time zone: UTC+01:00 (CET)
  - Summer (DST): UTC+02:00 (CEST)
- INSEE/Postal code: 01042 /01290
- Website: https://www.bey01.fr/
- ^{1} French Land Register data, which excludes lakes, ponds, glaciers > 1 km^{2} (0.386 sq mi or 247 acres) and river estuaries.

Bey (French pronunciation: [bɛ] beh; Arpitan: Bês) is a commune in the Ain department in centre-eastern France.

== Population ==
Historical population
Year	Pop.	±% p.a.
1968	105	—
1975	131	+3.21%
1982	181	+4.73%
1990	195	+0.94%
1999	221	+1.40%
2007	241	+1.09%
2012	260	+1.53%
2017	279	+1.42%
2023	286	+0.41%
Source: INSEE

== See also ==
- Communes of the Ain department
