= Crottet =

Commune in Auvergne-Rhône-Alpes, France

- Commune
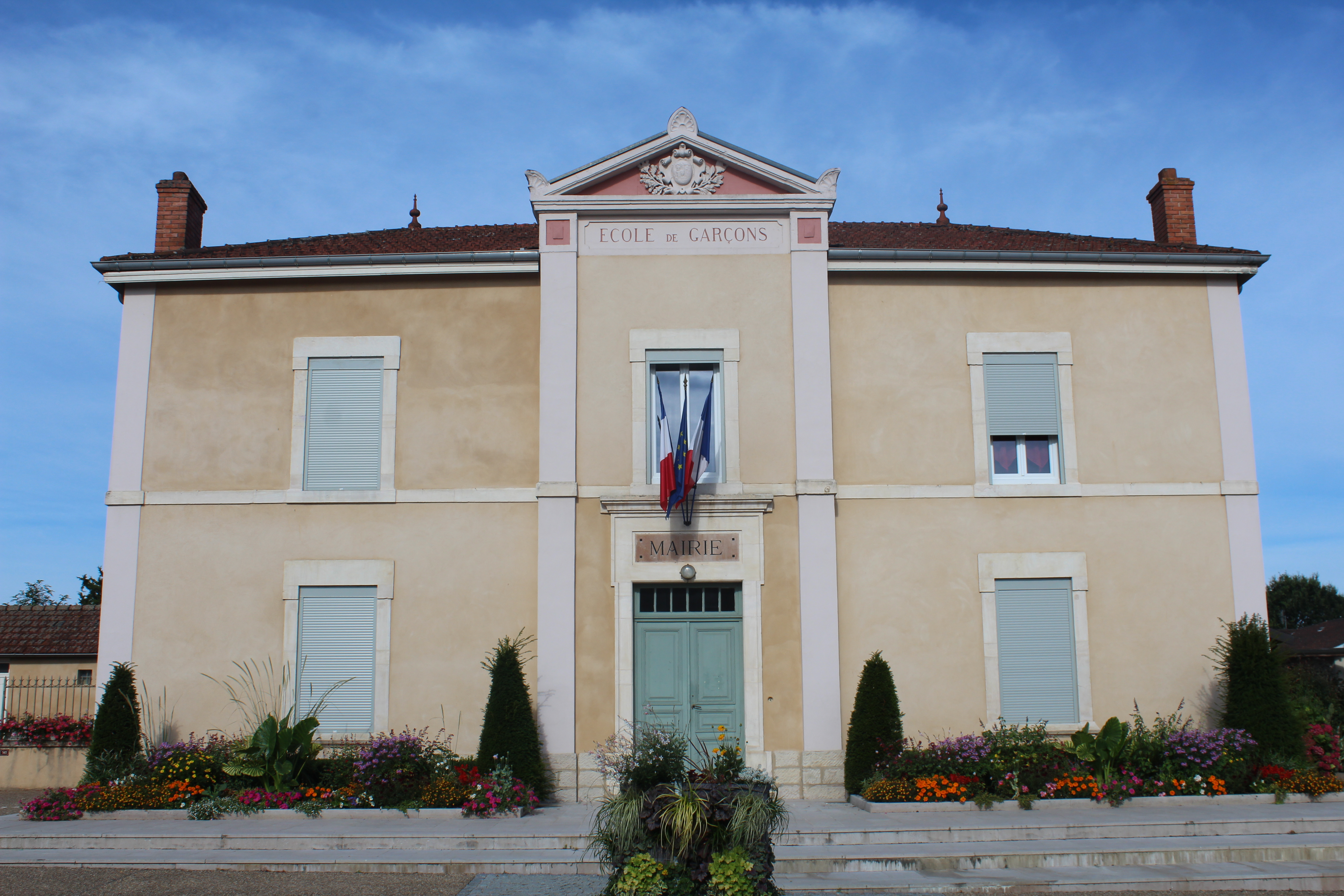
- Town hall
- Location of Crottet
- Location within France Location within Auvergne-Rhône-Alpes
- Coordinates: 46°16′41″N 4°53′34″E
- Country: France
- Region: Auvergne-Rhône-Alpes
- Department: Ain
- Arrondissement: Bourg-en-Bresse
- Canton: Vonnas
- Intercommunality: CC de la Veyle

Government
  - Mayor (2026–32): Jean-Philippe Lhotelais
- Area^{1}: 12.12 km^{2} (4.68 sq mi)
- Elevation: 176 m (577 ft)
- Highest elevation: 213 m (699 ft)
- Lowest elevation: 170 m (560 ft)
- Population (2023): 1,847
  - Density: 152.4/km^{2} (394.7/sq mi)
- Time zone: UTC+01:00 (CET)
  - Summer (DST): UTC+02:00 (CEST)
- INSEE/Postal code: 01134 /01290
- ^{1} French Land Register data, which excludes lakes, ponds, glaciers > 1 km^{2} (0.386 sq mi or 247 acres) and river estuaries.

Crottet (French pronunciation: [kʁɔtɛ]; Arpitan: Crotèt) is a commune in the Ain department in eastern France.

== Geography ==
The Veyle forms the commune's southwestern border, then flows into the Saône.

== Population ==
Historical population
| Year | Pop. | ±% p.a. |
|---|---|---|
| 1968 | 731 | — |
| 1975 | 891 | +2.87% |
| 1982 | 986 | +1.46% |
| 1990 | 1,313 | +3.65% |
| 1999 | 1,477 | +1.32% |
| 2007 | 1,676 | +1.59% |
| 2012 | 1,716 | +0.47% |
| 2017 | 1,734 | +0.21% |
| 2023 | 1,847 | +1.06% |
Source: INSEE

== See also ==
- Communes of the Ain department
