= Laiz =

Commune in Auvergne-Rhône-Alpes, France

- Commune
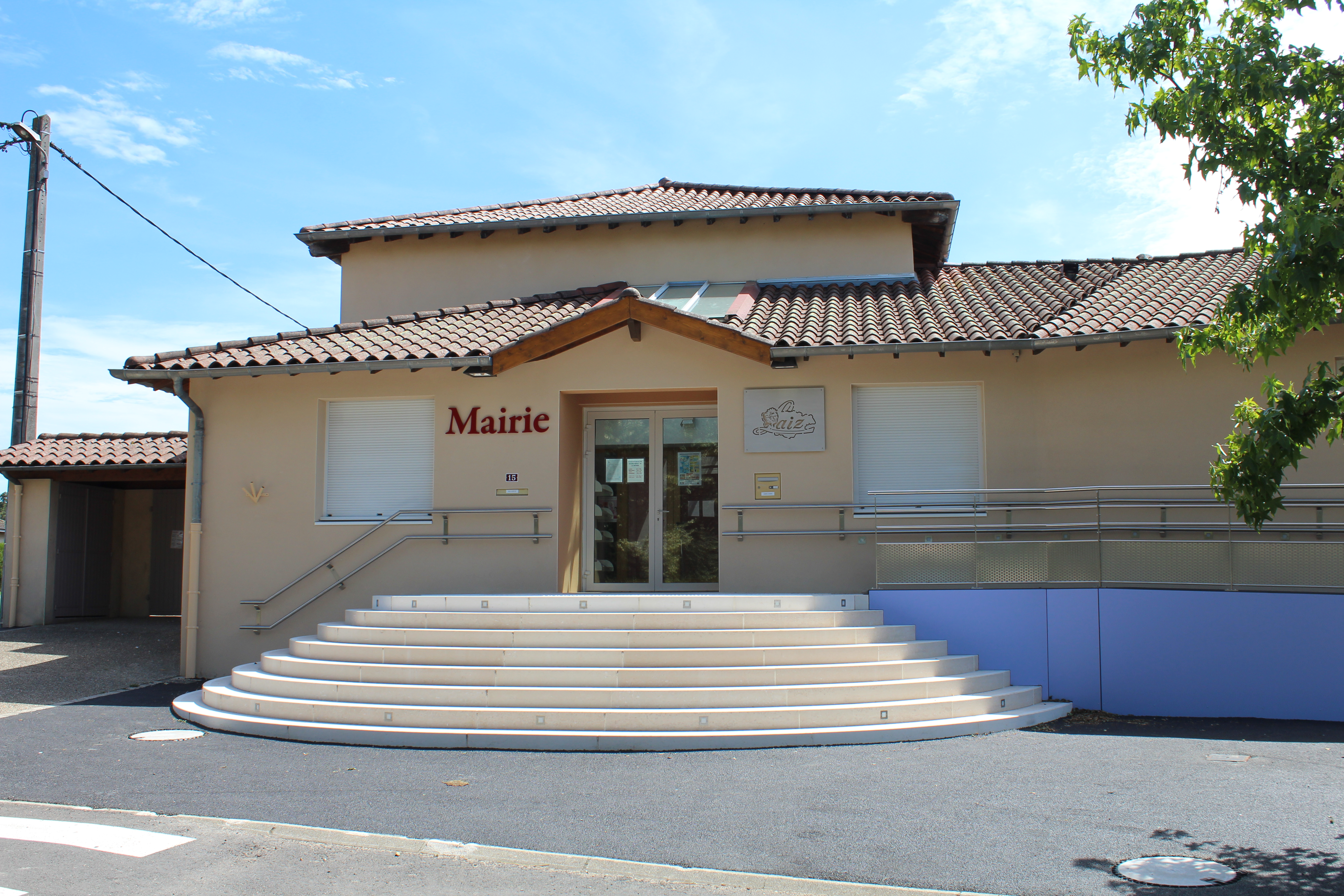
- Town hall
- Location of Laiz
- Location within France Location within Auvergne-Rhône-Alpes
- Coordinates: 46°14′56″N 4°53′21″E
- Country: France
- Region: Auvergne-Rhône-Alpes
- Department: Ain
- Arrondissement: Bourg-en-Bresse
- Canton: Vonnas

Government
  - Mayor (2026–32): Sébastien Schauving
- Area^{1}: 10.31 km^{2} (3.98 sq mi)
- Elevation: 200 m (660 ft)
- Highest elevation: 210 m (690 ft)
- Lowest elevation: 173 m (568 ft)
- Population (2023): 1,293
  - Density: 125.4/km^{2} (324.8/sq mi)
- Time zone: UTC+01:00 (CET)
  - Summer (DST): UTC+02:00 (CEST)
- INSEE/Postal code: 01203 /01290
- ^{1} French Land Register data, which excludes lakes, ponds, glaciers > 1 km^{2} (0.386 sq mi or 247 acres) and river estuaries.

Laiz is a commune in the Ain department in eastern France.

== Population ==
Historical population
Year	Pop.	±% p.a.
1968	388	—
1975	433	+1.58%
1982	567	+3.93%
1990	806	+4.49%
1999	986	+2.26%
2007	1,085	+1.20%
2012	1,149	+1.15%
2017	1,212	+1.07%
2023	1,293	+1.08%
Source: INSEE

== Sport ==
The 2024 Tour de l'Ain began at Laiz on 13 July.

== Gallery ==
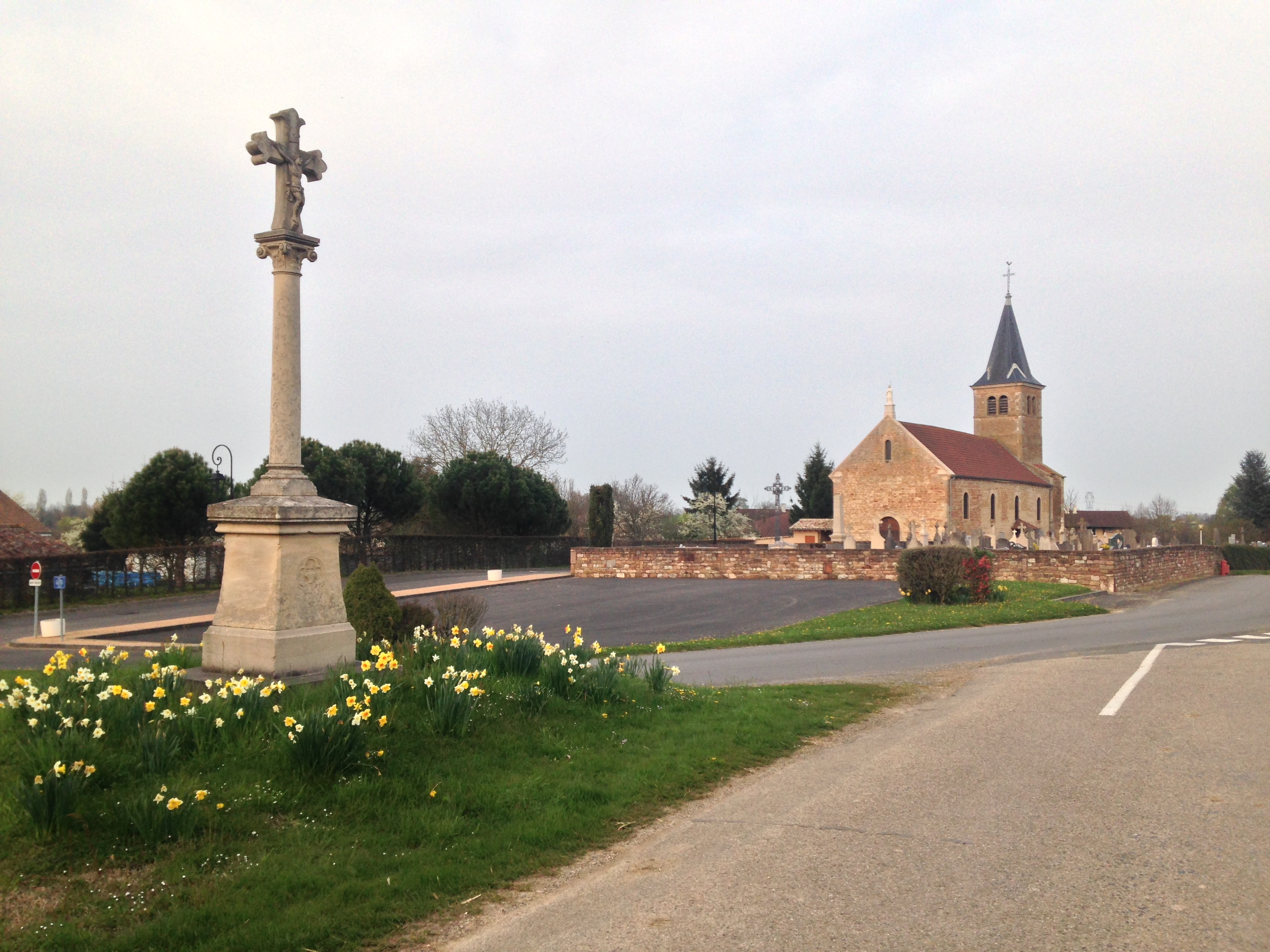

== See also ==
- Communes of the Ain department
