= Saint-Genis-sur-Menthon =

Commune in Auvergne-Rhône-Alpes, France

- Commune
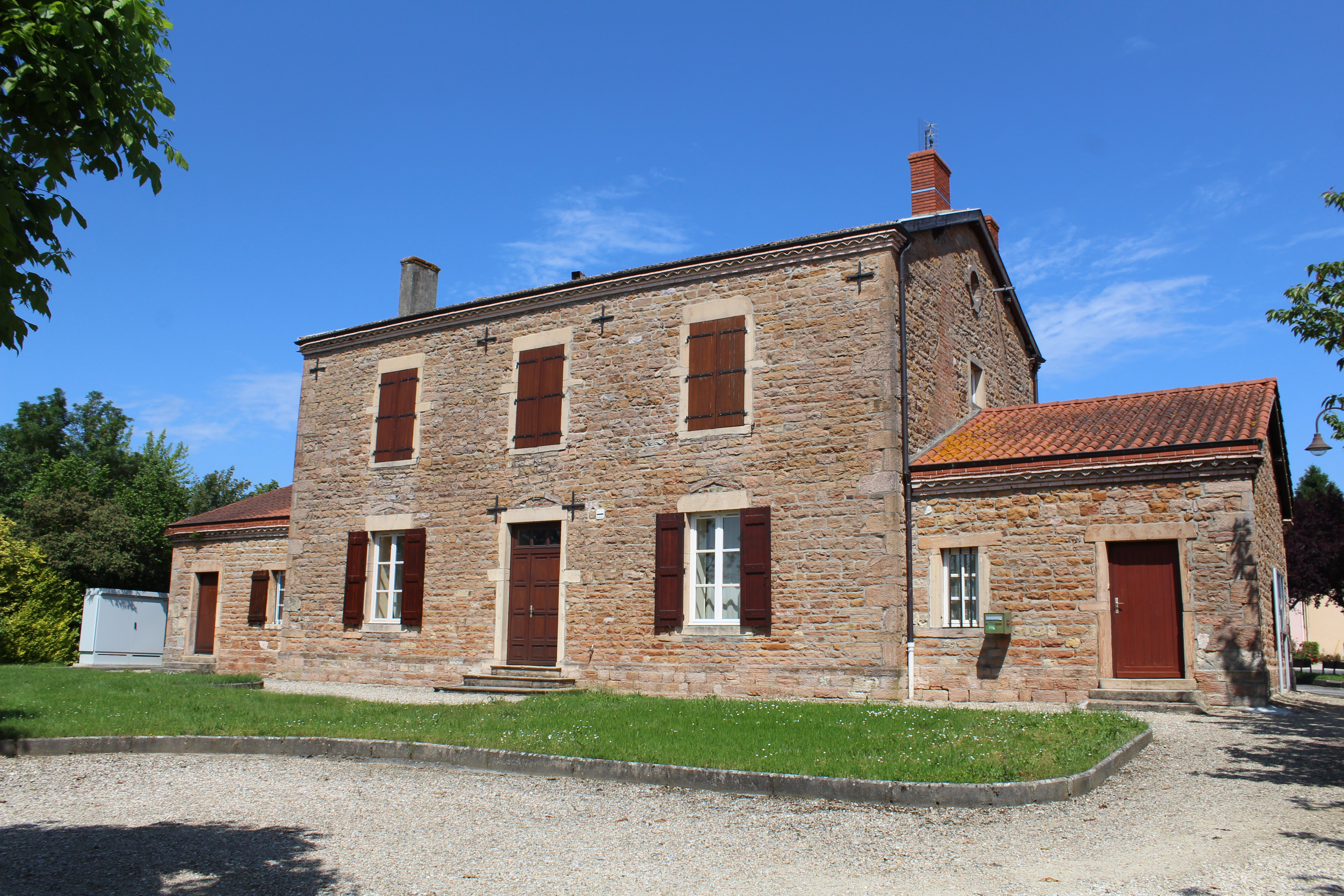
- Town hall
- Location of Saint-Genis-sur-Menthon
- Location within France Location within Auvergne-Rhône-Alpes
- Coordinates: 46°16′59″N 5°00′35″E
- Country: France
- Region: Auvergne-Rhône-Alpes
- Department: Ain
- Arrondissement: Bourg-en-Bresse
- Canton: Vonnas

Government
  - Mayor (2026–32): Christophe Greffet
- Area^{1}: 11.55 km^{2} (4.46 sq mi)
- Elevation: 235 m (771 ft)
- Highest elevation: 218 m (715 ft)
- Lowest elevation: 188 m (617 ft)
- Population (2023): 490
  - Density: 42/km^{2} (110/sq mi)
- Time zone: UTC+01:00 (CET)
  - Summer (DST): UTC+02:00 (CEST)
- INSEE/Postal code: 01355 /01380
- ^{1} French Land Register data, which excludes lakes, ponds, glaciers > 1 km^{2} (0.386 sq mi or 247 acres) and river estuaries.

Saint-Genis-sur-Menthon (French pronunciation: [sɛ̃ ʒəni syʁ mɑ̃tɔ̃]) is a commune in the Ain department in eastern France.

== Population ==
Historical population
Year	Pop.	±% p.a.
1968	301	—
1975	270	−1.54%
1982	299	+1.47%
1990	324	+1.01%
1999	363	+1.27%
2007	395	+1.06%
2012	447	+2.50%
2017	472	+1.09%
2023	490	+0.63%
Source: INSEE

== See also ==
- Communes of the Ain department
