= Saint-André-d'Huiriat =

Commune in Auvergne-Rhône-Alpes, France

- Commune
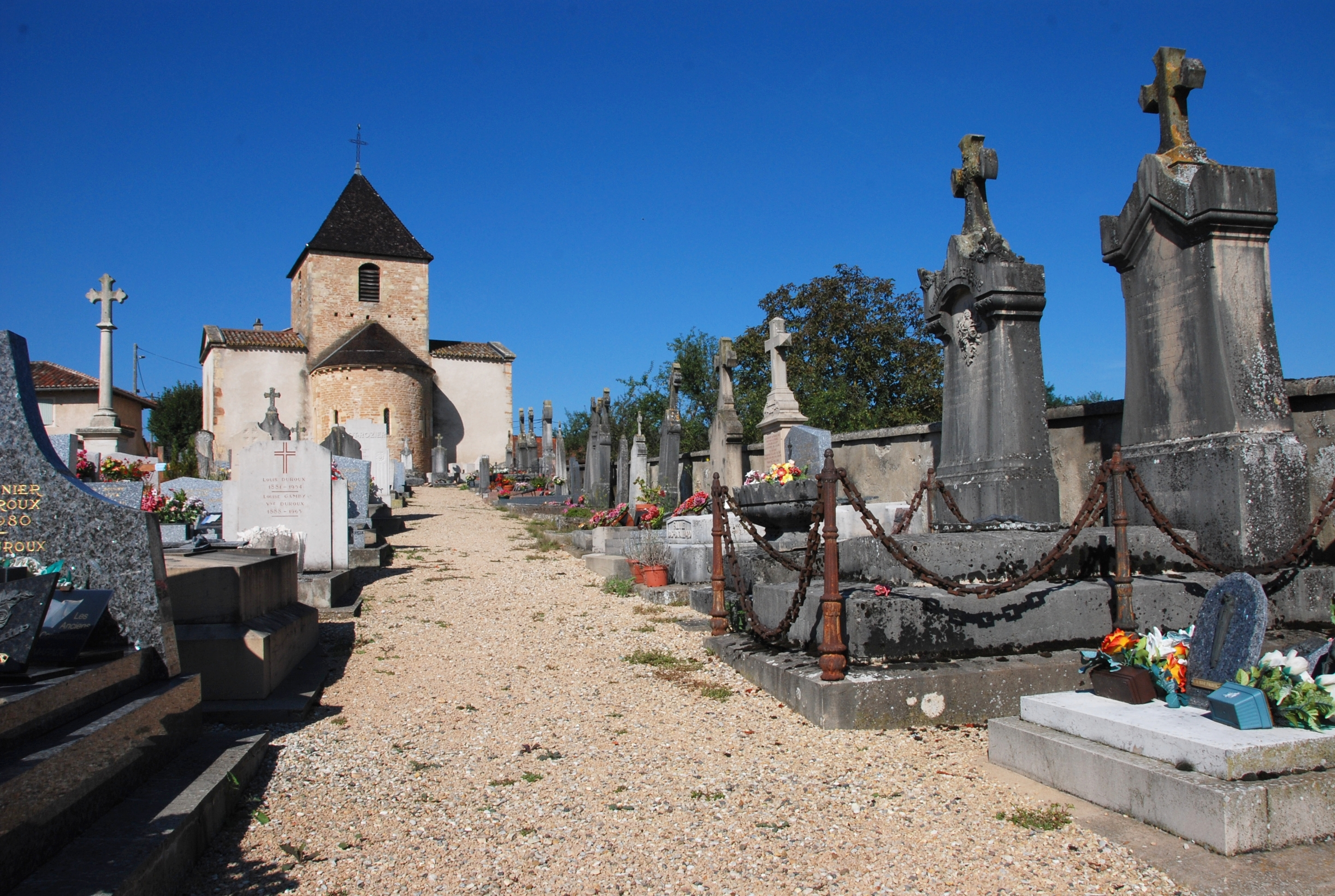
- Location of Saint-André-d'Huiriat
- Location within France Location within Auvergne-Rhône-Alpes
- Coordinates: 46°12′51″N 4°54′46″E
- Country: France
- Region: Auvergne-Rhône-Alpes
- Department: Ain
- Arrondissement: Bourg-en-Bresse
- Canton: Vonnas

Government
  - Mayor (2026–32): Dorian Douvres
- Area^{1}: 9 km^{2} (3.5 sq mi)
- Elevation: 210 m (690 ft)
- Highest elevation: 225 m (738 ft)
- Lowest elevation: 186 m (610 ft)
- Population (2023): 667
  - Density: 74/km^{2} (190/sq mi)
- Time zone: UTC+01:00 (CET)
  - Summer (DST): UTC+02:00 (CEST)
- INSEE/Postal code: 01334 /01290
- ^{1} French Land Register data, which excludes lakes, ponds, glaciers > 1 km^{2} (0.386 sq mi or 247 acres) and river estuaries.

Saint-André-d'Huiriat (French pronunciation: [sɛ̃t‿ɑ̃dʁe dɥiʁja]) is a commune in the Ain department in eastern France.

== Population ==
Historical population
Year	Pop.	±% p.a.
1968	366	—
1975	317	−2.03%
1982	334	+0.75%
1990	368	+1.22%
1999	402	+0.99%
2007	510	+3.02%
2012	539	+1.11%
2017	626	+3.04%
2023	667	+1.06%
Source: INSEE

== See also ==
- Communes of the Ain department
