= Pont-de-Veyle =

Commune in Auvergne-Rhône-Alpes, France

- Commune
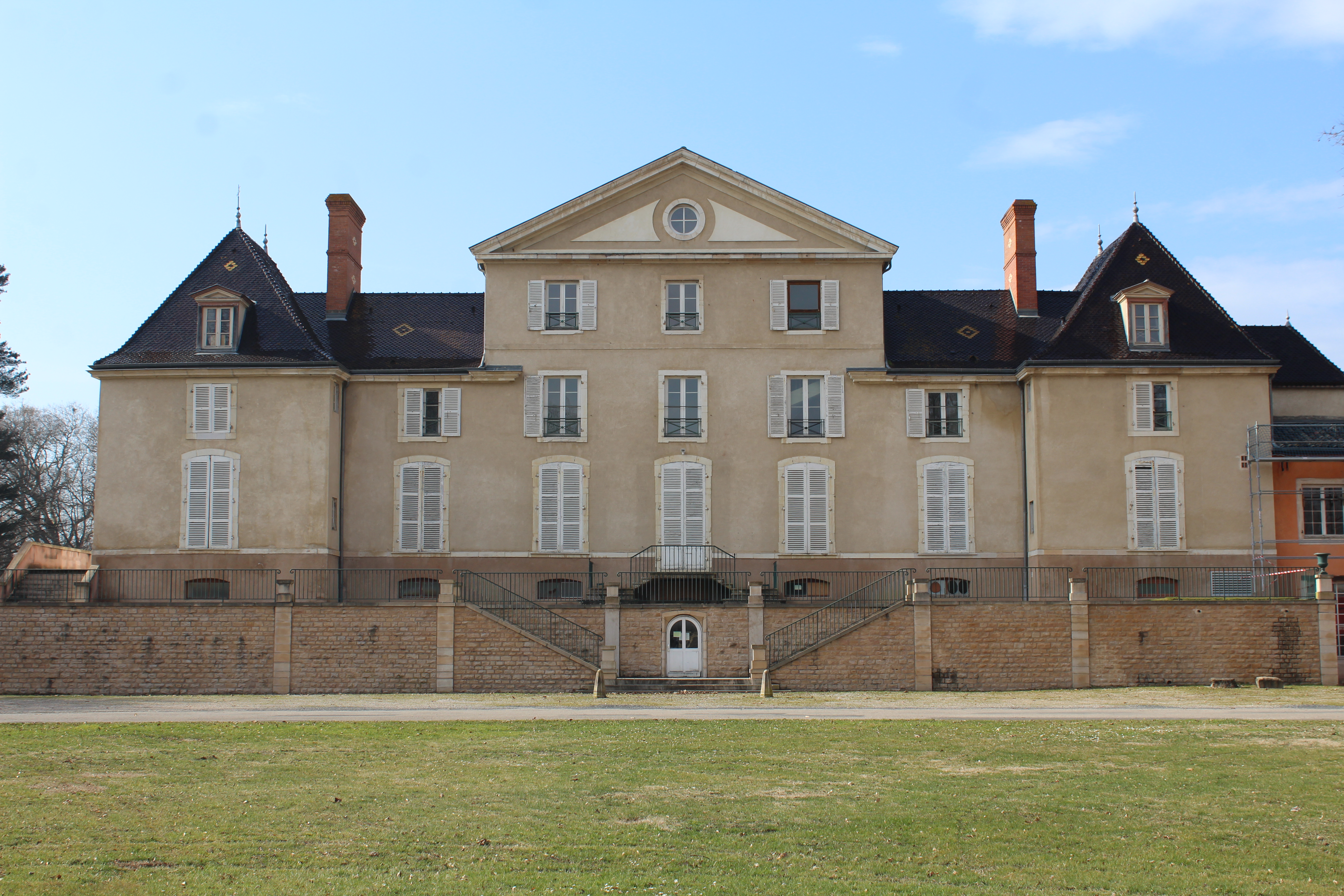
- Castle

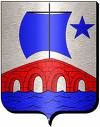
- Coat of arms
- Location of Pont-de-Veyle
- Location within France Location within Auvergne-Rhône-Alpes
- Coordinates: 46°15′49″N 4°53′19″E
- Country: France
- Region: Auvergne-Rhône-Alpes
- Department: Ain
- Arrondissement: Bourg-en-Bresse
- Canton: Vonnas

Government
  - Mayor (2026–32): Luc Michel
- Area^{1}: 1.94 km^{2} (0.75 sq mi)
- Elevation: 178 m (584 ft)
- Highest elevation: 179 m (587 ft)
- Lowest elevation: 172 m (564 ft)
- Population (2023): 1,594
  - Density: 822/km^{2} (2,130/sq mi)
- Time zone: UTC+01:00 (CET)
  - Summer (DST): UTC+02:00 (CEST)
- INSEE/Postal code: 01306 /01290
- ^{1} French Land Register data, which excludes lakes, ponds, glaciers > 1 km^{2} (0.386 sq mi or 247 acres) and river estuaries.

Pont-de-Veyle (French pronunciation: [pɔ̃ də vɛl], literally Bridge of Veyle) is a commune in the Ain department in eastern France.

== Geography ==
The Veyle flows west through the middle of the commune.

== Population ==
Historical population
Year	Pop.	±% p.a.
1968	1,144	—
1975	1,177	+0.41%
1982	1,253	+0.90%
1990	1,421	+1.59%
1999	1,484	+0.48%
2007	1,496	+0.10%
2012	1,604	+1.40%
2017	1,625	+0.26%
2023	1,594	−0.32%
Source: INSEE

== See also ==
- Communes of the Ain department
- List of medieval bridges in France
