= Perrex =

Commune in Auvergne-Rhône-Alpes, France

- Commune
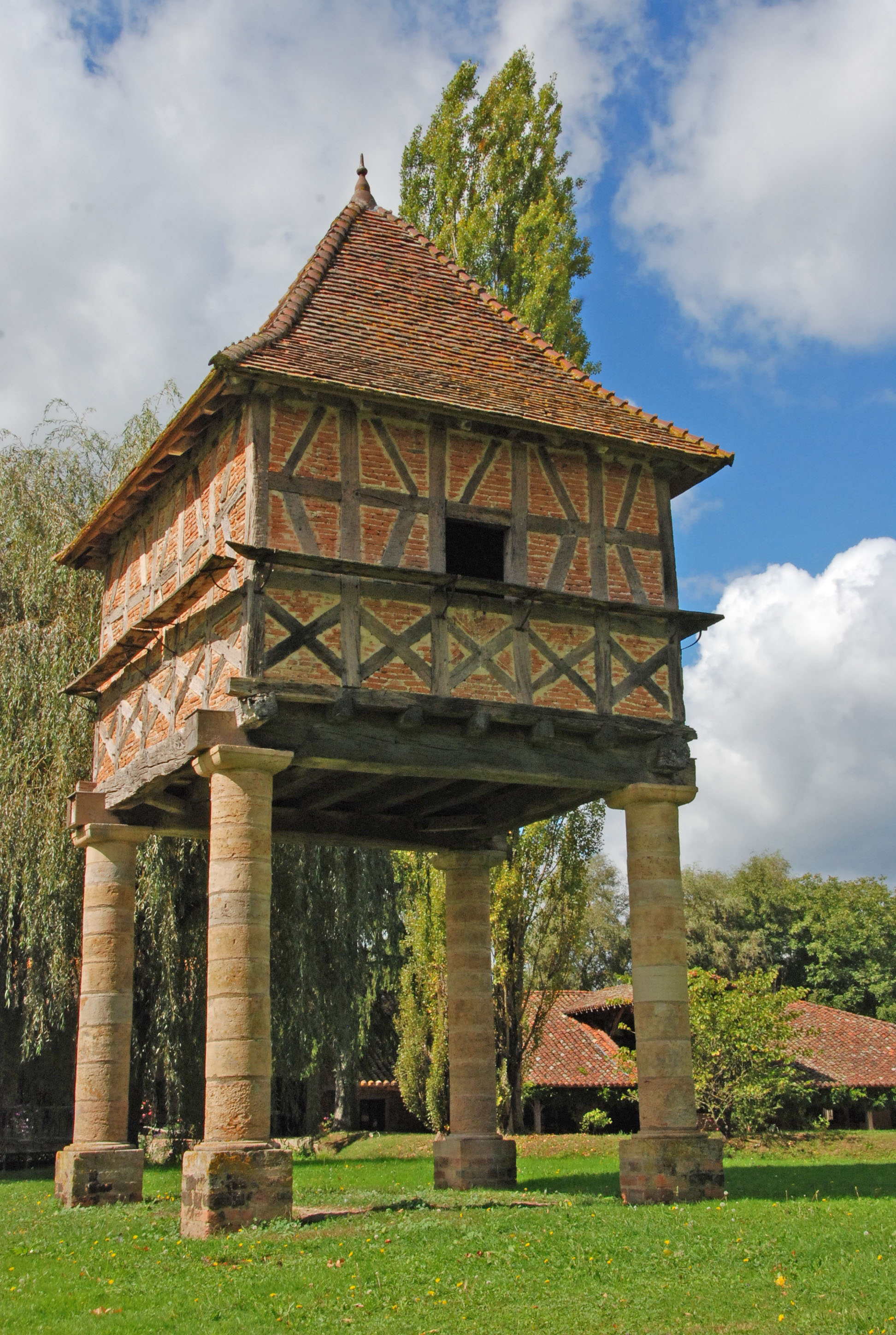
- Dovecote
- Location of Perrex
- Location within France Location within Auvergne-Rhône-Alpes
- Coordinates: 46°14′00″N 4°59′00″E
- Country: France
- Region: Auvergne-Rhône-Alpes
- Department: Ain
- Arrondissement: Bourg-en-Bresse
- Canton: Vonnas

Government
  - Mayor (2026–32): Jean-Jacques Vighetti
- Area^{1}: 11.1 km^{2} (4.3 sq mi)
- Elevation: 200 m (660 ft)
- Highest elevation: 213 m (699 ft)
- Lowest elevation: 179 m (587 ft)
- Population (2023): 869
  - Density: 78.3/km^{2} (203/sq mi)
- Time zone: UTC+01:00 (CET)
  - Summer (DST): UTC+02:00 (CEST)
- INSEE/Postal code: 01291 /01540
- ^{1} French Land Register data, which excludes lakes, ponds, glaciers > 1 km^{2} (0.386 sq mi or 247 acres) and river estuaries.

Perrex (French pronunciation: [peʁɛks]) is a commune in the Ain department in eastern France.

== Geography ==
The Veyle forms most of the commune's western border.

== Population ==
Historical population
Year	Pop.	±% p.a.
1968	506	—
1975	520	+0.39%
1982	606	+2.21%
1990	714	+2.07%
1999	721	+0.11%
2007	830	+1.78%
2012	795	−0.86%
2017	838	+1.06%
2023	869	+0.61%
Source: INSEE

== See also ==
- Communes of the Ain department
