= Cormoranche-sur-Saône =

Commune in Auvergne-Rhône-Alpes, France

- Commune
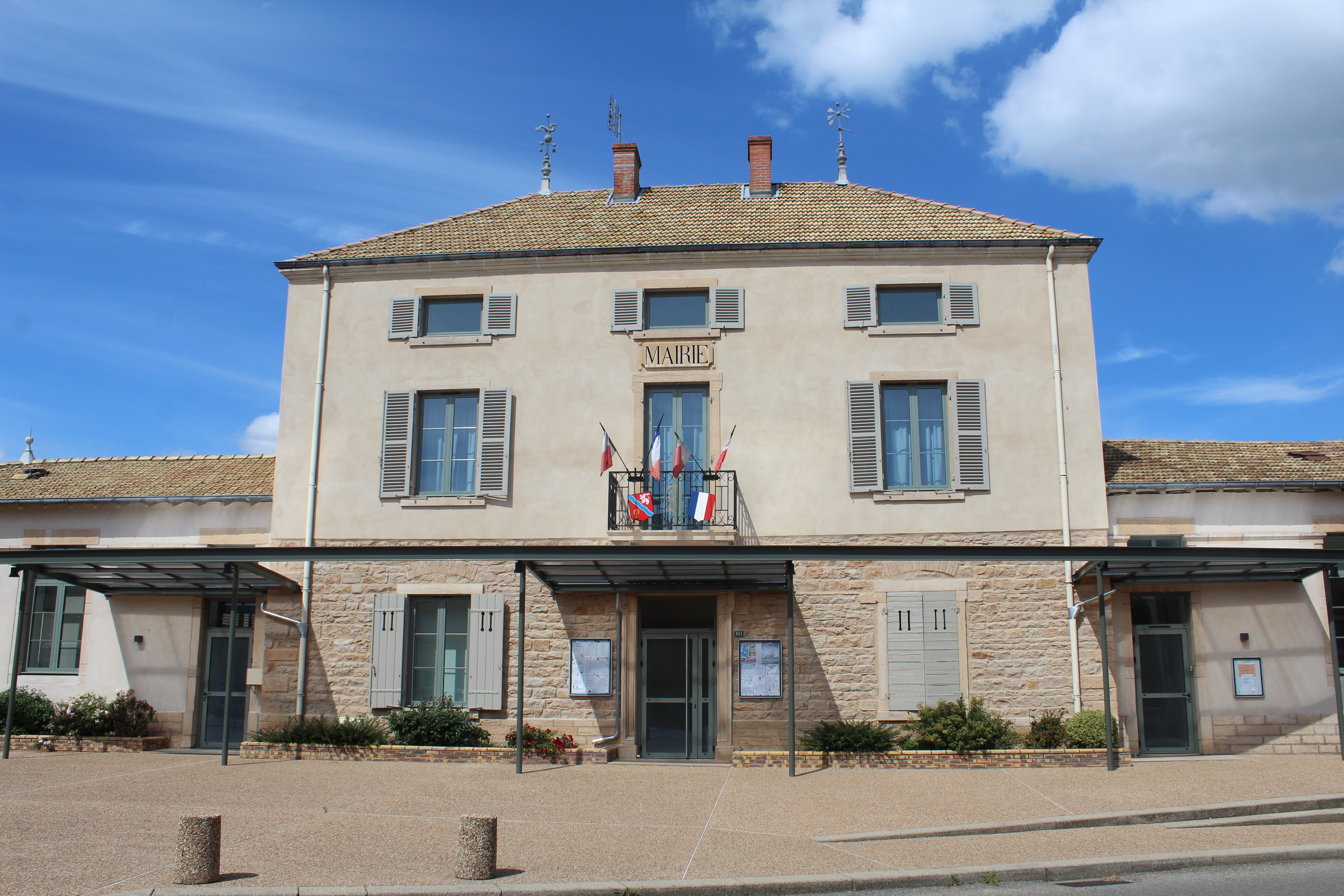
- Town hall

- Coat of arms
- Location of Cormoranche-sur-Saône
- Location within France Location within Auvergne-Rhône-Alpes
- Coordinates: 46°14′30″N 4°49′55″E
- Country: France
- Region: Auvergne-Rhône-Alpes
- Department: Ain
- Arrondissement: Bourg-en-Bresse
- Canton: Vonnas
- Intercommunality: CC de la Veyle

Government
  - Mayor (2026–32): Jacques Pallot
- Area^{1}: 9.85 km^{2} (3.80 sq mi)
- Elevation: 175 m (574 ft)
- Highest elevation: 211 m (692 ft)
- Lowest elevation: 168 m (551 ft)
- Population (2023): 1,179
  - Density: 120/km^{2} (310/sq mi)
- Time zone: UTC+01:00 (CET)
  - Summer (DST): UTC+02:00 (CEST)
- INSEE/Postal code: 01123 /01290
- ^{1} French Land Register data, which excludes lakes, ponds, glaciers > 1 km^{2} (0.386 sq mi or 247 acres) and river estuaries.

Cormoranche-sur-Saône (French pronunciation: [kɔʁmɔʁɑ̃ʃ syʁ son]) is a commune in the Ain department in eastern France.

== Population ==
Historical population
Year	Pop.	±% p.a.
1968	668	—
1975	752	+1.71%
1982	831	+1.44%
1990	780	−0.79%
1999	904	+1.65%
2007	1,022	+1.55%
2012	1,081	+1.13%
2017	1,138	+1.03%
2023	1,179	+0.59%
Source: INSEE

== See also ==
- Communes of the Ain department
