= Saint-Jean-sur-Veyle =

Commune in Auvergne-Rhône-Alpes, France

- Commune
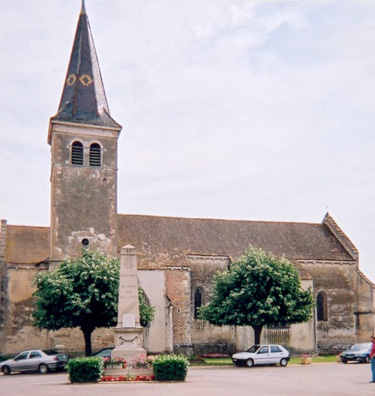

- Coat of arms
- Location of Saint-Jean-sur-Veyle
- Location within France Location within Auvergne-Rhône-Alpes
- Coordinates: 46°15′32″N 4°54′58″E
- Country: France
- Region: Auvergne-Rhône-Alpes
- Department: Ain
- Arrondissement: Bourg-en-Bresse
- Canton: Vonnas
- Intercommunality: Veyle

Government
  - Mayor (2026–32): Agnès Renoud-Lyat
- Area^{1}: 11.21 km^{2} (4.33 sq mi)
- Elevation: 183 m (600 ft)
- Highest elevation: 213 m (699 ft)
- Lowest elevation: 176 m (577 ft)
- Population (2023): 1,143
  - Density: 102.0/km^{2} (264.1/sq mi)
- Time zone: UTC+01:00 (CET)
  - Summer (DST): UTC+02:00 (CEST)
- INSEE/Postal code: 01365 /01290
- ^{1} French Land Register data, which excludes lakes, ponds, glaciers > 1 km^{2} (0.386 sq mi or 247 acres) and river estuaries.

Saint-Jean-sur-Veyle (pronounced [sɛ̃ ʒɑ̃ syʁ vɛl], lit. 'Saint-Jean on Veyle') is a commune in the Ain department in eastern France.

== Geography ==
The Veyle flows northwest through the southern part of the commune.

== Population ==
Historical population
Year	Pop.	±% p.a.
1968	694	—
1975	690	−0.08%
1982	845	+2.94%
1990	926	+1.15%
1999	958	+0.38%
2007	1,051	+1.16%
2012	1,087	+0.68%
2017	1,149	+1.12%
2023	1,143	−0.09%
Source: INSEE

== See also ==
- Communes of the Ain department
