= Cruzilles-lès-Mépillat =

Commune in Auvergne-Rhône-Alpes, France

- Commune
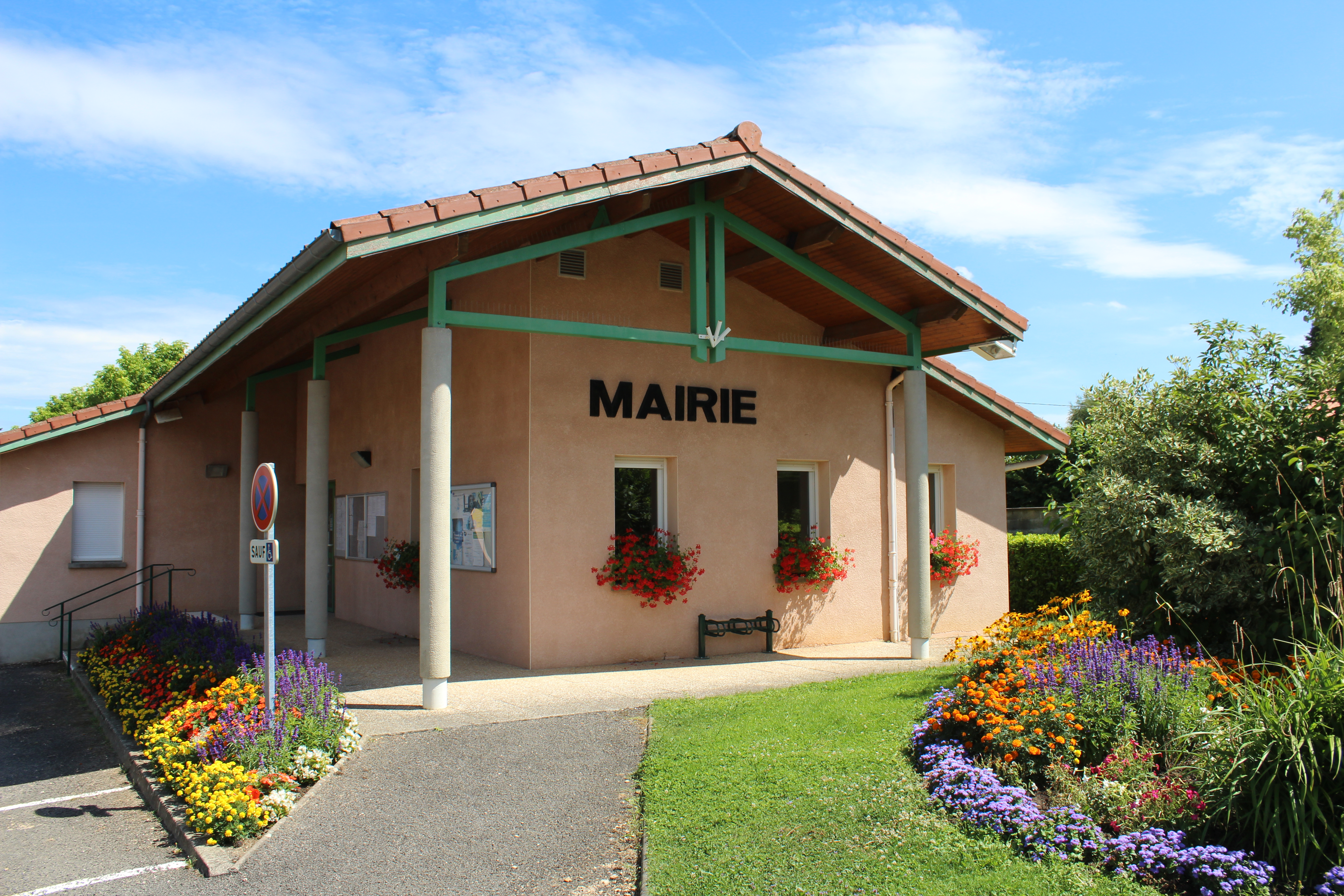
- Town hall
- Location of Cruzilles-lès-Mépillat
- Location within France Location within Auvergne-Rhône-Alpes
- Coordinates: 46°13′32″N 4°52′53″E
- Country: France
- Region: Auvergne-Rhône-Alpes
- Department: Ain
- Arrondissement: Bourg-en-Bresse
- Canton: Vonnas

Government
  - Mayor (2026–32): Dominique Boyer
- Area^{1}: 11.84 km^{2} (4.57 sq mi)
- Elevation: 220 m (720 ft)
- Highest elevation: 222 m (728 ft)
- Lowest elevation: 185 m (607 ft)
- Population (2023): 984
  - Density: 83.1/km^{2} (215/sq mi)
- Time zone: UTC+01:00 (CET)
  - Summer (DST): UTC+02:00 (CEST)
- INSEE/Postal code: 01136 /01290
- ^{1} French Land Register data, which excludes lakes, ponds, glaciers > 1 km^{2} (0.386 sq mi or 247 acres) and river estuaries.

Cruzilles-lès-Mépillat (French pronunciation: [kʁyzij lɛ mepija]) is a commune in the Ain department in eastern France.

== Population ==
Historical population
Year	Pop.	±% p.a.
1968	515	—
1975	477	−1.09%
1982	500	+0.68%
1990	580	+1.87%
1999	651	+1.29%
2007	781	+2.30%
2012	829	+1.20%
2017	868	+0.92%
2023	984	+2.11%
Source: INSEE

== See also ==
- Communes of the Ain department
