= Canton of Montrevel-en-Bresse =

Coordinates: 46°20′15″N 5°07′44″E

Montrevel-en-Bresse
- Former canton
- Interactive map of Montrevel-en-Bresse
- Country: France
- Region: Auvergne-Rhône-Alpes
- Department: Ain
- No. of communes: {{{nbcomm}}}
- Disbanded: 2015
- Area: 213.83 km^{2} (82.56 sq mi)
- Population (2012): 17,145
  - Density: 80.181/km^{2} (207.67/sq mi)

The canton of Montrevel-en-Bresse is a former administrative division in eastern France. It was disbanded following the French canton reorganisation which came into effect in March 2015. It consisted of 14 communes, which joined the new canton of Attignat in 2015. It had 17,145 inhabitants (2012).

The canton comprised 14 communes:

- Attignat
- Béréziat
- Confrançon
- Cras-sur-Reyssouze
- Curtafond
- Étrez
- Foissiat
- Jayat
- Malafretaz
- Marsonnas
- Montrevel-en-Bresse
- Saint-Didier-d'Aussiat
- Saint-Martin-le-Châtel
- Saint-Sulpice

== Demographics ==
Historical population Canton of Montrevel-en-Bresse
Year	1962	1968	1975	1982	1990	1999
Pop.	9,108	9,917	9,946	11,025	11,374	12,416
±%	—	+8.9%	+0.3%	+10.8%	+3.2%	+9.2%
From the year 1962 on: No double counting – residents of multiple communes (e.g. students and military personnel) are counted only once. Source: INSEE

== See also ==
- Cantons of the Ain department
