= Canton of Viriat =

Coordinates: 46°15′N 5°13′E

Viriat
- Former canton
- Interactive map of Viriat
- Country: France
- Region: Auvergne-Rhône-Alpes
- Department: Ain
- No. of communes: {{{nbcomm}}}
- Disbanded: 2015
- Area: 103.97 km^{2} (40.14 sq mi)
- Population (2012): 17,061
  - Density: 164.10/km^{2} (425.01/sq mi)

The canton of Viriat is a former administrative division in eastern France. It was disbanded following the French canton reorganisation which came into effect in March 2015. It had 17,061 inhabitants (2012).

The canton comprised 6 communes:

- Buellas
- Montcet
- Polliat
- Saint-Denis-lès-Bourg
- Vandeins
- Viriat

== Demographics ==
Historical population Canton of Viriat
Year	1962	1968	1975	1982	1990	1999
Pop.	7,062	8,140	9,625	10,815	12,868	14,515
±%	—	+15.3%	+18.2%	+12.4%	+19.0%	+12.8%
From the year 1962 on: No double counting – residents of multiple communes (e.g. students and military personnel) are counted only once. Source: INSEE

== See also ==
- Cantons of the Ain department
