= Cras-sur-Reyssouze =

Part of Bresse Vallons in Auvergne-Rhône-Alpes, France

- Part of Bresse Vallons
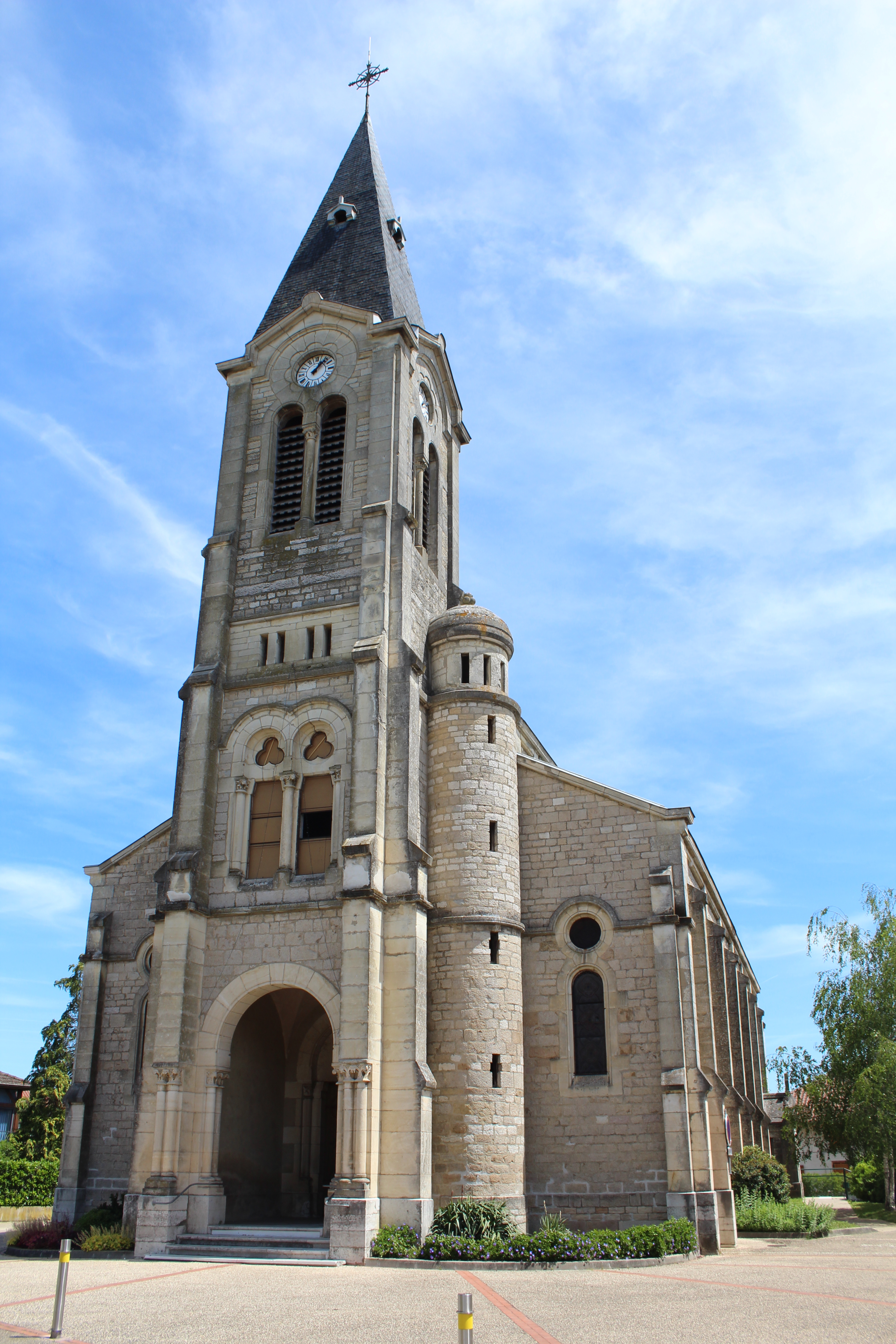
- Location of Cras-sur-Reyssouze
- Location within France Location within Auvergne-Rhône-Alpes
- Coordinates: 46°18′33″N 5°09′59″E
- Country: France
- Region: Auvergne-Rhône-Alpes
- Department: Ain
- Arrondissement: Bourg-en-Bresse
- Canton: Attignat
- Commune: Bresse Vallons
- Area^{1}: 13.83 km^{2} (5.34 sq mi)
- Highest elevation: 229 m (751 ft)
- Lowest elevation: 195 m (640 ft)
- Population (2022): 1,523
  - Density: 110.1/km^{2} (285.2/sq mi)
- Time zone: UTC+01:00 (CET)
  - Summer (DST): UTC+02:00 (CEST)
- Postal code: 01340
- ^{1} French Land Register data, which excludes lakes, ponds, glaciers > 1 km^{2} (0.386 sq mi or 247 acres) and river estuaries.

Cras-sur-Reyssouze is a former commune in the Ain department in eastern France. On 1 January 2019, it was merged into the new commune of Bresse Vallons.

== Population ==
Historical population
Year	Pop.	±% p.a.
2006	1,091	—
2011	1,307	+3.68%
2015	1,431	+2.29%
2022	1,523	+0.89%
Source: INSEE

== See also ==
- Communes of the Ain department
