= Château de Loriol =

French castle

Coordinates: 46°16′44″N 5°02′24″E

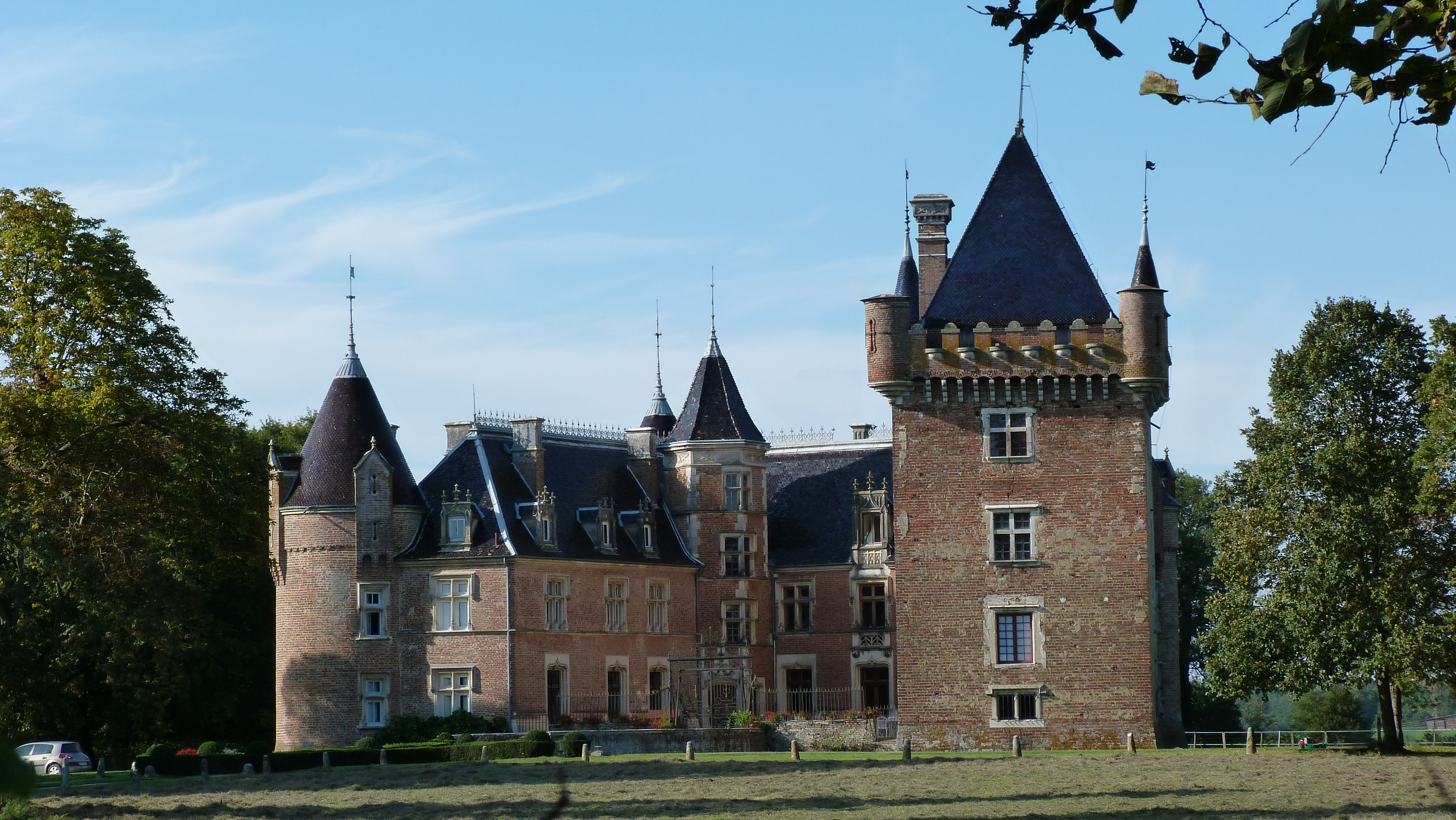
Château de Loriol

The Château de Loriol is a castle located in Confrançon, Ain, France. It was originally built by Barthelemy de Sachins in 1324 on his seigneurie of Asnières les Bois in Bresse (Ain) and has never been alienated from the descendants of this family. It was part of the dowry of Françoise de Chacipol in 1535 and the de Loriol family has held this property until the present day. It is for this reason that the property has been known as the Château de Loriol since the 17th century. The current holder of the property is Arnaud Duport de Loriol, 8th Comte de Loriol (LP1743).

The castle was restored in 1860 by architect Charles Martin, in a transitional Gothic / Renaissance style. The building, including a dungeon from the 13th century, escaped damage from World War II.
