= Parc botanique de la Teyssonnière =

Botanical garden in Rhône-Alpes, France

Coordinates: 46.2036°N 5.1426°E

The Parc botanique de la Teyssonnière (15 hectares) is a botanical garden and park located on the Chemin de La Teyssonnière, Buellas, Ain, Rhône-Alpes, France. It is open daily in May; an admission fee is charged.

The garden was originally created as a park surrounding the mansion of engineer and mayor Charles-de-Nestor Agricol Lateyssonnière (1777-1845), and revived from 1957 onwards by radiologist Dr. Auplat. It first opened to the public in 1980.

Today the garden contains about 1,000 types of plants, arranged in natural areas, deer park, Italian and romantic gardens, Japanese garden, and Zen garden. It features azaleas, camellias, magnolias, rhododendrons, and Japanese maples.

== See also ==
- List of botanical gardens in France
