= Bresse Vallons =

Commune in Auvergne-Rhône-Alpes, France

- Commune
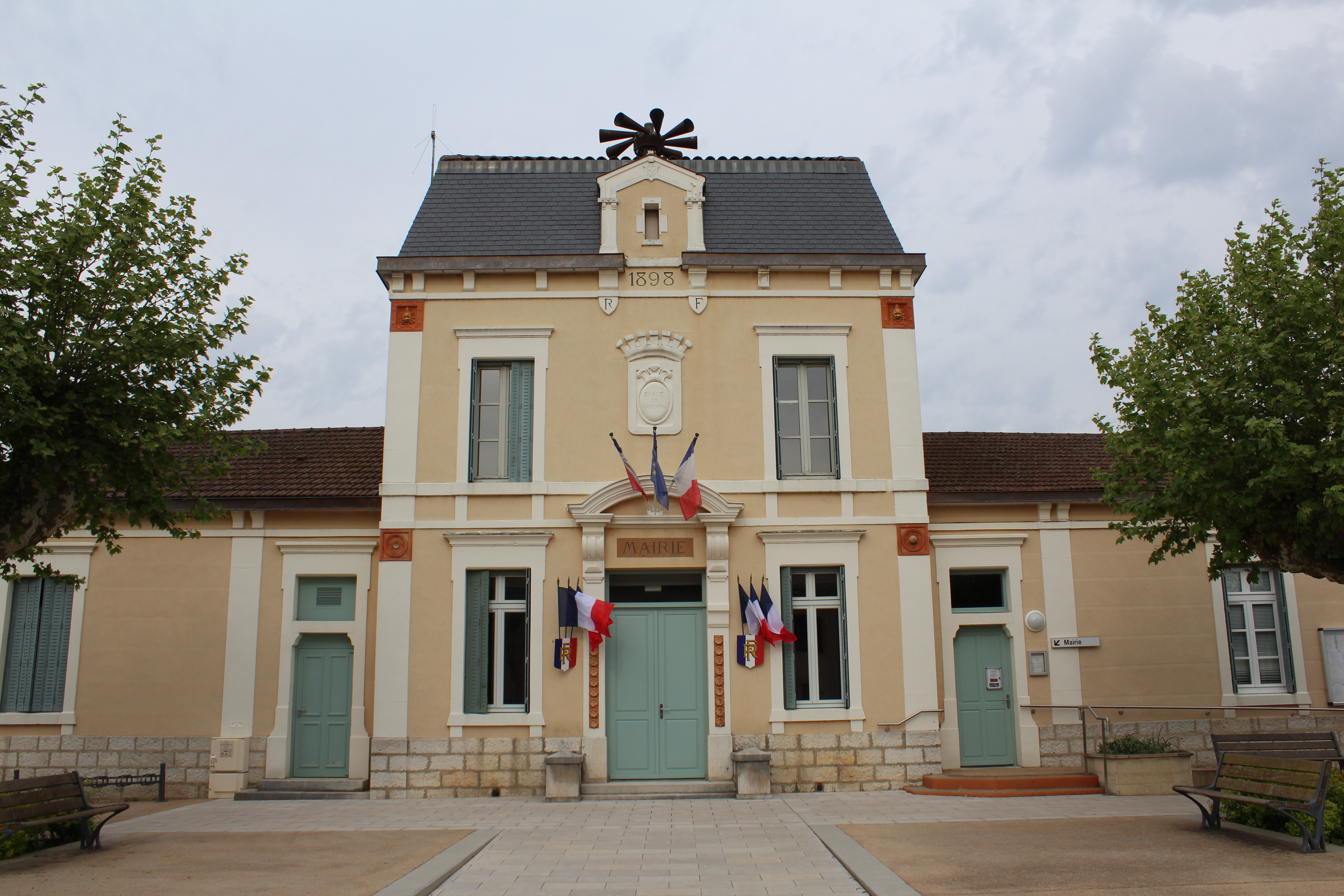
- Town hall in Cras-sur-Reyssouze
- Location of Bresse Vallons
- Location within France Location within Auvergne-Rhône-Alpes
- Coordinates: 46°18′33″N 5°09′59″E
- Country: France
- Region: Auvergne-Rhône-Alpes
- Department: Ain
- Arrondissement: Bourg-en-Bresse
- Canton: Attignat
- Intercommunality: CA Bassin de Bourg-en-Bresse

Government
  - Mayor (2026–32): Virginie Grignola-Bernard
- Area^{1}: 25.98 km^{2} (10.03 sq mi)
- Highest elevation: 229 m (751 ft)
- Lowest elevation: 195 m (640 ft)
- Population (2023): 2,388
  - Density: 91.92/km^{2} (238.1/sq mi)
- Time zone: UTC+01:00 (CET)
  - Summer (DST): UTC+02:00 (CEST)
- INSEE/Postal code: 01130 /01340
- Website: https://www.bressevallons.fr/
- ^{1} French Land Register data, which excludes lakes, ponds, glaciers > 1 km^{2} (0.386 sq mi or 247 acres) and river estuaries.

Bresse Vallons is a commune in the eastern French department of Ain. It is the result of the merger, on 1 January 2019, of the communes of Cras-sur-Reyssouze and Étrez.

== Population ==
Populations of the area corresponding with the commune of Bresse Vallons at 1 January 2025.

Historical population
Year	Pop.	±% p.a.
1968	1,077	—
1975	1,091	+0.18%
1982	1,312	+2.67%
1990	1,356	+0.41%
1999	1,549	+1.49%
2007	1,886	+2.49%
2012	2,164	+2.79%
2017	2,282	+1.07%
2023	2,388	+0.76%
Source: INSEE

== See also ==
- Communes of the Ain department
