= Montracol =

Commune in Auvergne-Rhône-Alpes, France

- Commune
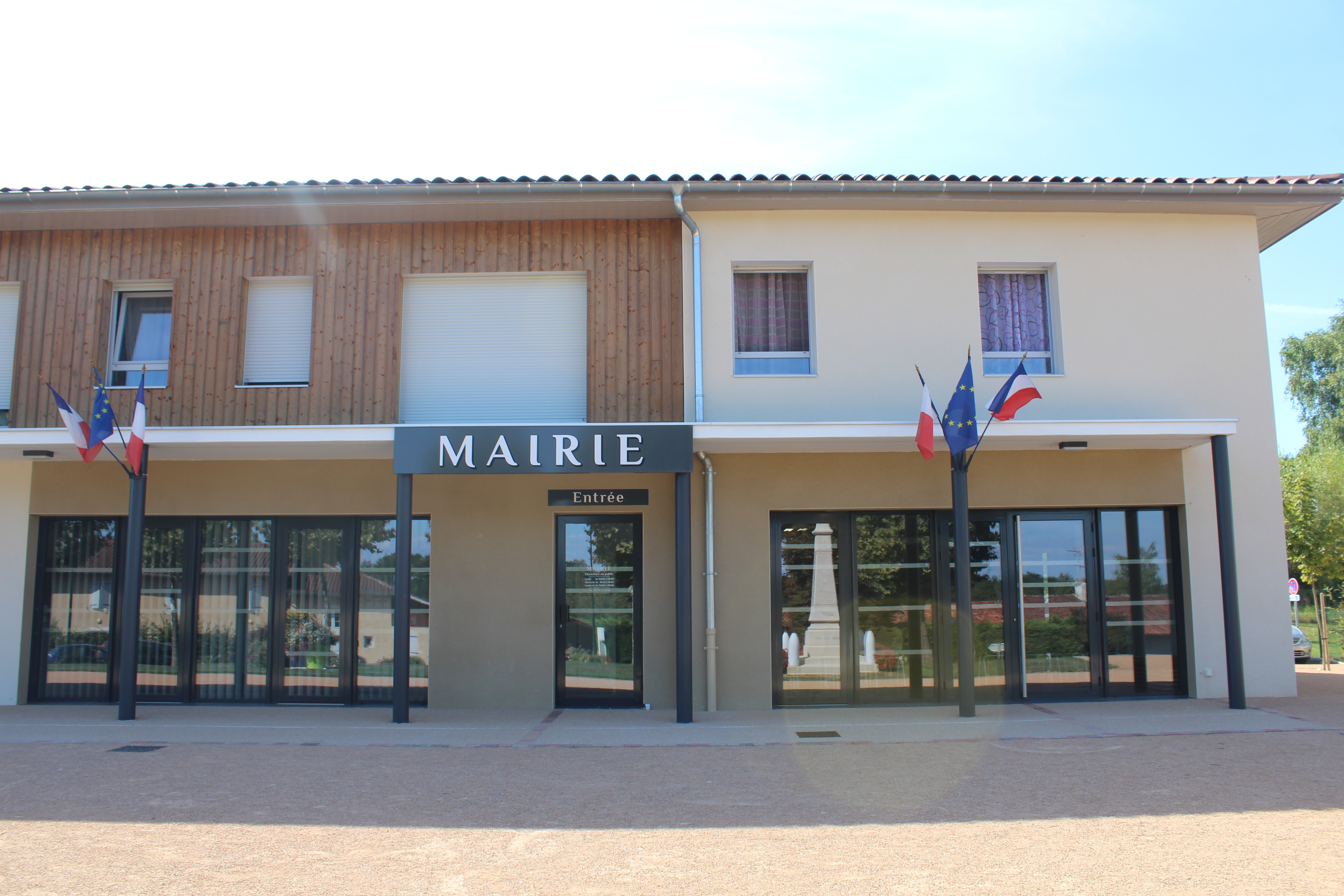
- Town hall
- Location of Montracol
- Location within France Location within Auvergne-Rhône-Alpes
- Coordinates: 46°11′00″N 5°07′00″E
- Country: France
- Region: Auvergne-Rhône-Alpes
- Department: Ain
- Arrondissement: Bourg-en-Bresse
- Canton: Attignat
- Intercommunality: CA Bassin de Bourg-en-Bresse

Government
  - Mayor (2026–32): David Lafont
- Area^{1}: 14.56 km^{2} (5.62 sq mi)
- Highest elevation: 258 m (846 ft)
- Lowest elevation: 211 m (692 ft)
- Population (2023): 1,018
  - Density: 69.92/km^{2} (181.1/sq mi)
- Time zone: UTC+01:00 (CET)
  - Summer (DST): UTC+02:00 (CEST)
- INSEE/Postal code: 01264 /01310
- ^{1} French Land Register data, which excludes lakes, ponds, glaciers > 1 km^{2} (0.386 sq mi or 247 acres) and river estuaries.

Montracol (French pronunciation: [mɔ̃ʁakɔl]) is a commune in the Ain department in eastern France.

== Population ==
Historical population
Year	Pop.	±% p.a.
1968	429	—
1975	450	+0.69%
1982	584	+3.79%
1990	551	−0.72%
1999	619	+1.30%
2007	892	+4.67%
2012	984	+1.98%
2017	1,040	+1.11%
2023	1,018	−0.36%
Source: INSEE

== See also ==
- Communes of the Ain department
