= Communauté d'agglomération du Bassin de Bourg-en-Bresse =

Coordinates: 46°15′N 05°15′E

Bassin de Bourg-en-Bresse
- Communauté d'agglomération
- Interactive map of Bassin de Bourg-en-Bresse
- Country: France
- Region: Auvergne-Rhône-Alpes
- Department: Ain
- No. of communes: {{{nbcomm}}}
- Established: 2017
- Area: 1,236.8 km^{2} (477.5 sq mi)
- Population (2017): 132,380
  - Density: 107.03/km^{2} (277.22/sq mi)
- Website: www.grandbourg.fr

Communauté d'agglomération du Bassin de Bourg-en-Bresse is the communauté d'agglomération, an intercommunal structure, centred on the city of Bourg-en-Bresse. It is located in the Ain department, in the Auvergne-Rhône-Alpes region, eastern France. It was created in January 2017 by the merger of the former Communauté d'agglomération de Bourg-en-Bresse with 6 former communautés de communes. Its seat is in Bourg-en-Bresse. Its area is 1236.8 km^{2}. Its population was 132,380 in 2017, of which 41,527 in Bourg-en-Bresse proper.

== Composition ==
The communauté d'agglomération consists of the following 74 communes:

1. Attignat
2. Beaupont
3. Bény
4. Béréziat
5. Bohas-Meyriat-Rignat
6. Bourg-en-Bresse
7. Bresse Vallons
8. Buellas
9. Certines
10. Ceyzériat
11. Cize
12. Coligny
13. Confrançon
14. Cormoz
15. Corveissiat
16. Courmangoux
17. Courtes
18. Curciat-Dongalon
19. Curtafond
20. Dompierre-sur-Veyle
21. Domsure
22. Drom
23. Druillat
24. Foissiat
25. Grand-Corent
26. Hautecourt-Romanèche
27. Jasseron
28. Jayat
29. Journans
30. Lent
31. Lescheroux
32. Malafretaz
33. Mantenay-Montlin
34. Marboz
35. Marsonnas
36. Meillonnas
37. Montagnat
38. Montcet
39. Montracol
40. Montrevel-en-Bresse
41. Nivigne et Suran
42. Péronnas
43. Pirajoux
44. Polliat
45. Pouillat
46. Ramasse
47. Revonnas
48. Saint-André-sur-Vieux-Jonc
49. Saint-Denis-lès-Bourg
50. Saint-Didier-d'Aussiat
51. Saint-Étienne-du-Bois
52. Saint-Jean-sur-Reyssouze
53. Saint-Julien-sur-Reyssouze
54. Saint-Just
55. Saint-Martin-du-Mont
56. Saint-Martin-le-Châtel
57. Saint-Nizier-le-Bouchoux
58. Saint-Rémy
59. Saint-Sulpice
60. Saint-Trivier-de-Courtes
61. Salavre
62. Servas
63. Servignat
64. Simandre-sur-Suran
65. Tossiat
66. La Tranclière
67. Val-Revermont
68. Vandeins
69. Verjon
70. Vernoux
71. Vescours
72. Villemotier
73. Villereversure
74. Viriat
