= Curtafond =

Commune in Auvergne-Rhône-Alpes, France

- Commune
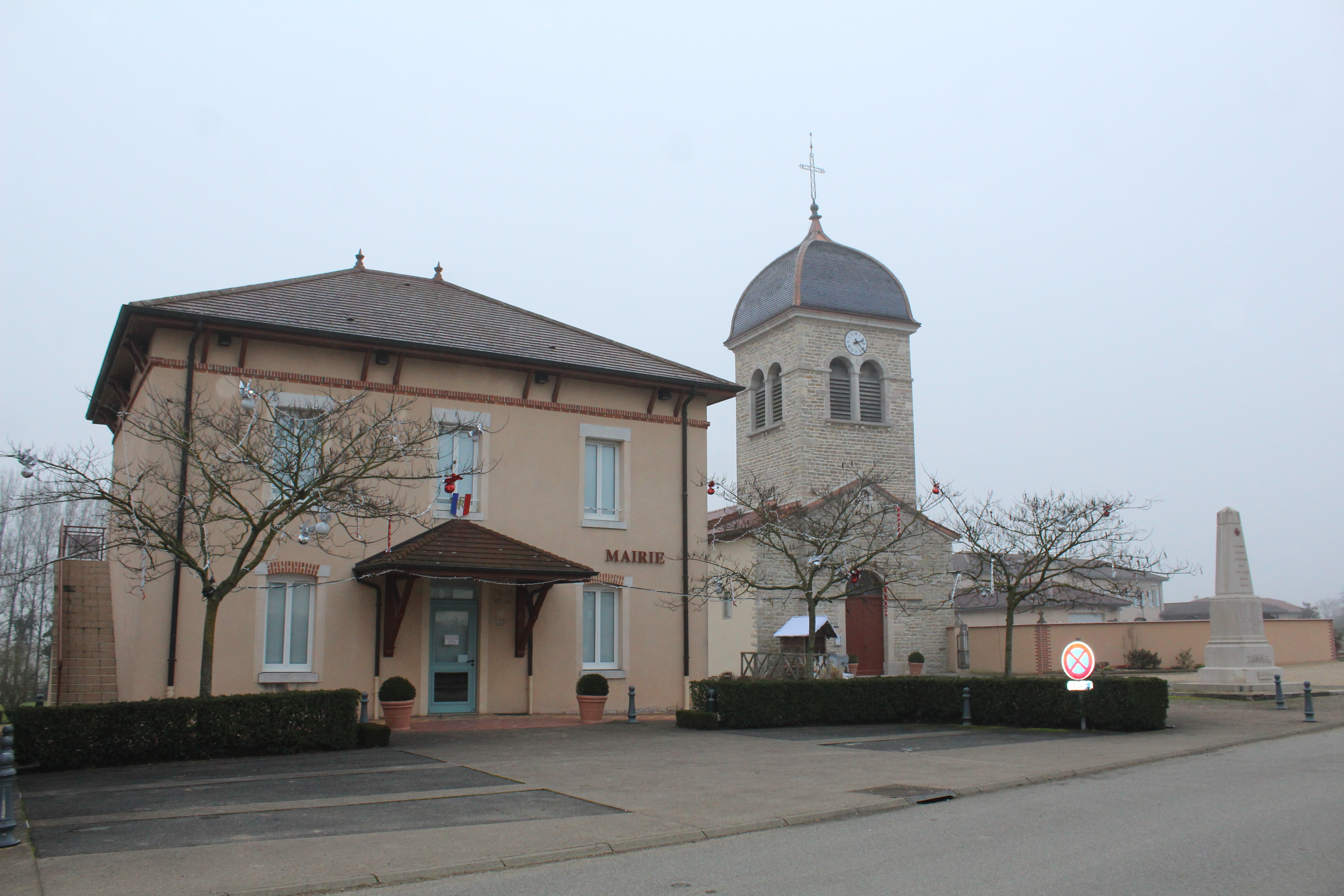
- Town hall and church
- Location of Curtafond
- Location within France Location within Auvergne-Rhône-Alpes
- Coordinates: 46°16′24″N 5°05′22″E
- Country: France
- Region: Auvergne-Rhône-Alpes
- Department: Ain
- Arrondissement: Bourg-en-Bresse
- Canton: Attignat
- Intercommunality: CA Bassin de Bourg-en-Bresse

Government
  - Mayor (2026–32): Michel Givord
- Area^{1}: 12.41 km^{2} (4.79 sq mi)
- Highest elevation: 227 m (745 ft)
- Lowest elevation: 199 m (653 ft)
- Population (2023): 825
  - Density: 66.5/km^{2} (172/sq mi)
- Time zone: UTC+01:00 (CET)
  - Summer (DST): UTC+02:00 (CEST)
- INSEE/Postal code: 01140 /01310
- ^{1} French Land Register data, which excludes lakes, ponds, glaciers > 1 km^{2} (0.386 sq mi or 247 acres) and river estuaries.

Curtafond (French pronunciation: [kyʁtafɔ̃]) is a commune in the Ain department in eastern France.

== Population ==
Historical population
Year	Pop.	±% p.a.
1968	409	—
1975	382	−0.97%
1982	427	+1.60%
1990	422	−0.15%
1999	590	+3.79%
2007	672	+1.64%
2012	726	+1.56%
2017	770	+1.18%
2023	825	+1.16%
Source: INSEE

== See also ==
- Communes of the Ain department
