= Foissiat =

Commune in Auvergne-Rhône-Alpes, France

- Commune
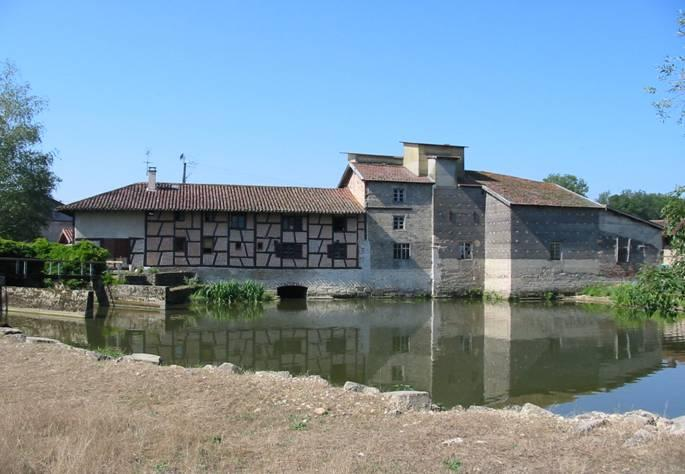
- Mill

- Coat of arms
- Location of Foissiat
- Location within France Location within Auvergne-Rhône-Alpes
- Coordinates: 46°22′16″N 5°10′32″E
- Country: France
- Region: Auvergne-Rhône-Alpes
- Department: Ain
- Arrondissement: Bourg-en-Bresse
- Canton: Attignat
- Intercommunality: CA Bassin de Bourg-en-Bresse

Government
  - Mayor (2026–32): Jean-Luc Picard
- Area^{1}: 40.36 km^{2} (15.58 sq mi)
- Highest elevation: 228 m (748 ft)
- Lowest elevation: 186 m (610 ft)
- Population (2023): 2,034
  - Density: 50.40/km^{2} (130.5/sq mi)
- Time zone: UTC+01:00 (CET)
  - Summer (DST): UTC+02:00 (CEST)
- INSEE/Postal code: 01163 /01340
- ^{1} French Land Register data, which excludes lakes, ponds, glaciers > 1 km^{2} (0.386 sq mi or 247 acres) and river estuaries.

Foissiat (French pronunciation: [fwasja]) is a commune in the Ain department in eastern France.

== Geography ==
The Sâne Morte has its source in the commune.

== Population ==
Historical population

Year	Pop.	±% p.a.
1793	2,558	—
1800	2,467	−0.52%
1806	2,318	−1.03%
1821	2,270	−0.14%
1831	2,262	−0.04%
1836	2,285	+0.20%
1841	2,370	+0.73%
1846	2,446	+0.63%
1851	2,509	+0.51%
1856	2,493	−0.13%
1861	2,520	+0.22%
1866	2,498	−0.18%
1872	2,474	−0.16%
1876	2,476	+0.02%
1881	2,722	+1.91%
1886	2,565	−1.18%
1891	2,530	−0.27%
1896	2,642	+0.87%
1901	2,541	−0.78%

Year	Pop.	±% p.a.
1906	2,518	−0.18%
1911	2,514	−0.03%
1921	2,222	−1.23%
1926	2,210	−0.11%
1931	2,202	−0.07%
1936	2,151	−0.47%
1946	1,934	−1.06%
1954	1,811	−0.82%
1962	1,674	−0.98%
1968	1,515	−1.65%
1975	1,403	−1.09%
1982	1,466	+0.63%
1990	1,481	+0.13%
1999	1,562	+0.59%
2007	1,828	+1.99%
2012	1,980	+1.61%
2017	2,085	+1.04%
2023	2,034	−0.41%

Source: EHESS and INSEE (1968-2023)

== See also ==
- Communes of the Ain department
