= Montrevel-en-Bresse =

Commune in Auvergne-Rhône-Alpes, France

- Commune
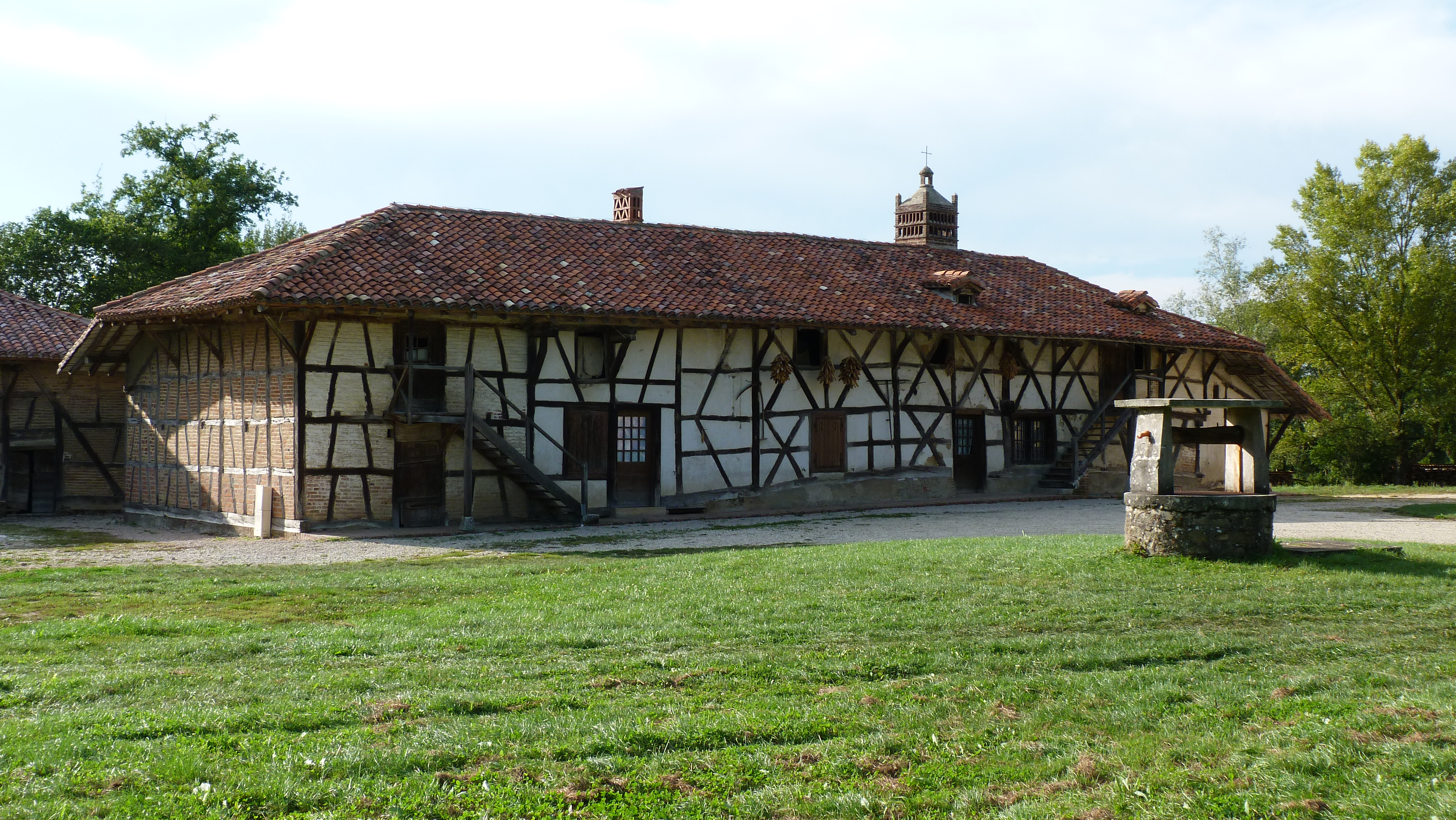
- Sougey farm

- Coat of arms
- Location of Montrevel-en-Bresse
- Location within France Location within Auvergne-Rhône-Alpes
- Coordinates: 46°20′15″N 5°07′44″E
- Country: France
- Region: Auvergne-Rhône-Alpes
- Department: Ain
- Arrondissement: Bourg-en-Bresse
- Canton: Attignat
- Intercommunality: CA Bassin de Bourg-en-Bresse

Government
  - Mayor (2026–32): Jean-Yves Brevet
- Area^{1}: 10.27 km^{2} (3.97 sq mi)
- Elevation: 215 m (705 ft)
- Highest elevation: 220 m (720 ft)
- Lowest elevation: 192 m (630 ft)
- Population (2023): 2,743
  - Density: 267.1/km^{2} (691.8/sq mi)
- Time zone: UTC+01:00 (CET)
  - Summer (DST): UTC+02:00 (CEST)
- INSEE/Postal code: 01266 /01340
- ^{1} French Land Register data, which excludes lakes, ponds, glaciers > 1 km^{2} (0.386 sq mi or 247 acres) and river estuaries.

Montrevel-en-Bresse (French pronunciation: [mɔ̃(t)ʁəvɛl ɑ̃ bʁɛs], literally Montrevel in Bresse) is a commune in the Ain department in eastern France.

== Population ==
Historical population

Year	Pop.	±% p.a.
1793	1,236	—
1800	1,242	+0.07%
1806	1,118	−1.74%
1821	1,220	+0.58%
1831	1,408	+1.44%
1836	1,390	−0.26%
1841	1,401	+0.16%
1846	1,491	+1.25%
1851	1,464	−0.36%
1856	1,466	+0.03%
1861	1,485	+0.26%
1866	1,496	+0.15%
1872	1,475	−0.24%
1876	1,515	+0.67%
1881	1,545	+0.39%
1886	1,517	−0.37%
1891	1,465	−0.70%
1896	1,483	+0.24%
1901	1,483	+0.00%

Year	Pop.	±% p.a.
1906	1,435	−0.66%
1911	1,468	+0.46%
1921	1,340	−0.91%
1926	1,363	+0.34%
1931	1,340	−0.34%
1936	1,391	+0.75%
1946	1,300	−0.67%
1954	1,343	+0.41%
1962	1,388	+0.41%
1968	1,495	+1.25%
1975	1,653	+1.45%
1982	2,000	+2.76%
1990	1,973	−0.17%
1999	1,994	+0.12%
2007	2,311	+1.86%
2012	2,415	+0.88%
2017	2,489	+0.61%
2023	2,743	+1.63%

Source: EHESS and INSEE (1968-2023)

== See also ==
- Communes of the Ain department
