= Vandeins =

Commune in Auvergne-Rhône-Alpes, France

- Commune
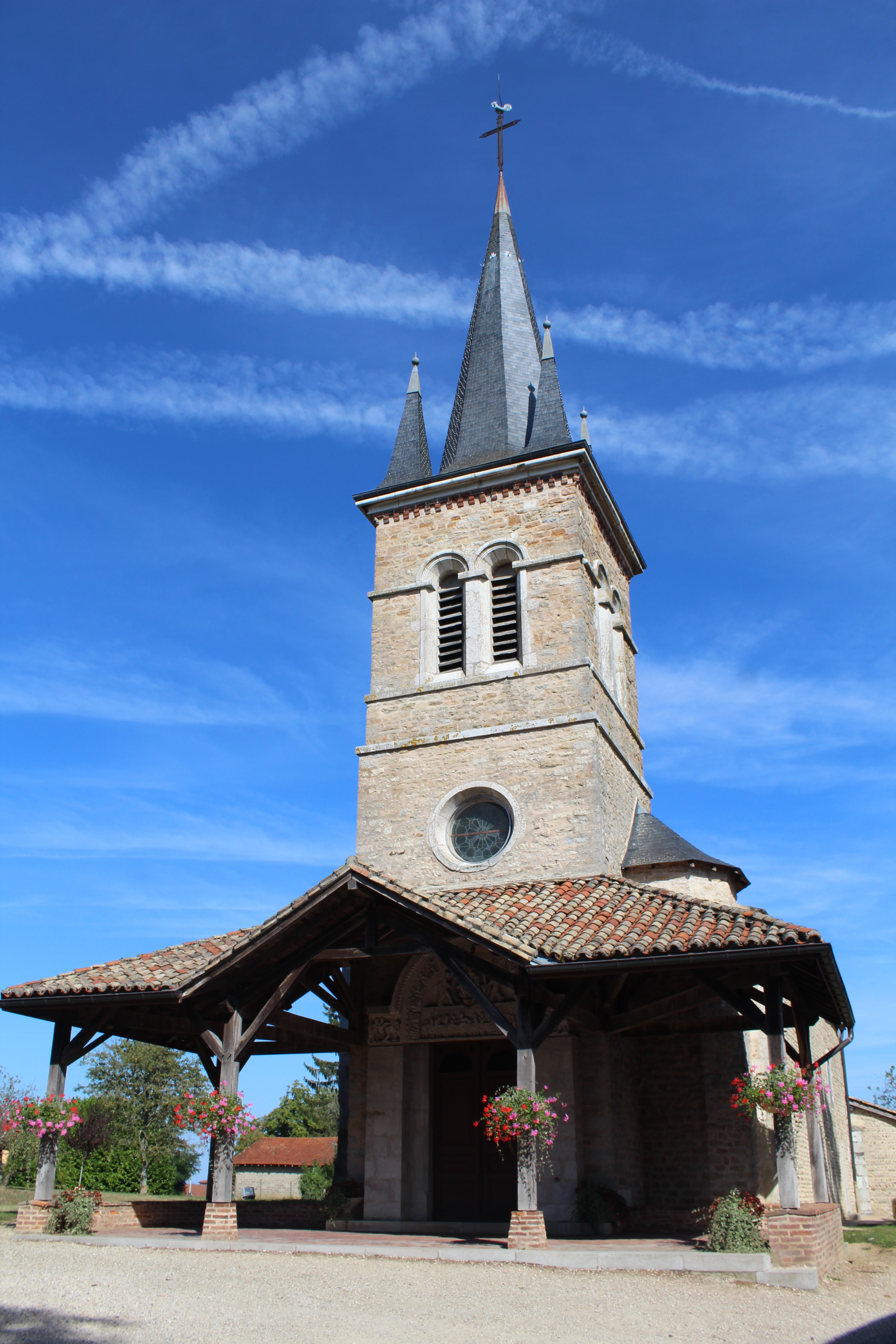
- Location of Vandeins
- Location within France Location within Auvergne-Rhône-Alpes
- Coordinates: 46°13′06″N 5°04′48″E
- Country: France
- Region: Auvergne-Rhône-Alpes
- Department: Ain
- Arrondissement: Bourg-en-Bresse
- Canton: Attignat
- Intercommunality: CA Bassin de Bourg-en-Bresse

Government
  - Mayor (2026–32): Christelle Bérardan
- Area^{1}: 9.4 km^{2} (3.6 sq mi)
- Elevation: 230 m (750 ft)
- Highest elevation: 251 m (823 ft)
- Lowest elevation: 194 m (636 ft)
- Population (2023): 732
  - Density: 78/km^{2} (200/sq mi)
- Time zone: UTC+01:00 (CET)
  - Summer (DST): UTC+02:00 (CEST)
- INSEE/Postal code: 01429 /01660
- ^{1} French Land Register data, which excludes lakes, ponds, glaciers > 1 km^{2} (0.386 sq mi or 247 acres) and river estuaries.

Vandeins (French pronunciation: [vɑ̃dɛ̃]; Arpitan: Vandens) is a commune in Ain, a department in eastern France.

== Population ==
Historical population
Year	Pop.	±% p.a.
1968	258	—
1975	250	−0.45%
1982	329	+4.00%
1990	415	+2.95%
1999	510	+2.32%
2007	590	+1.84%
2012	654	+2.08%
2017	687	+0.99%
2023	732	+1.06%
Source: INSEE

== See also ==
- Communes of the Ain department
