= Saint-Martin-le-Châtel =

Commune in Auvergne-Rhône-Alpes, France

- Commune
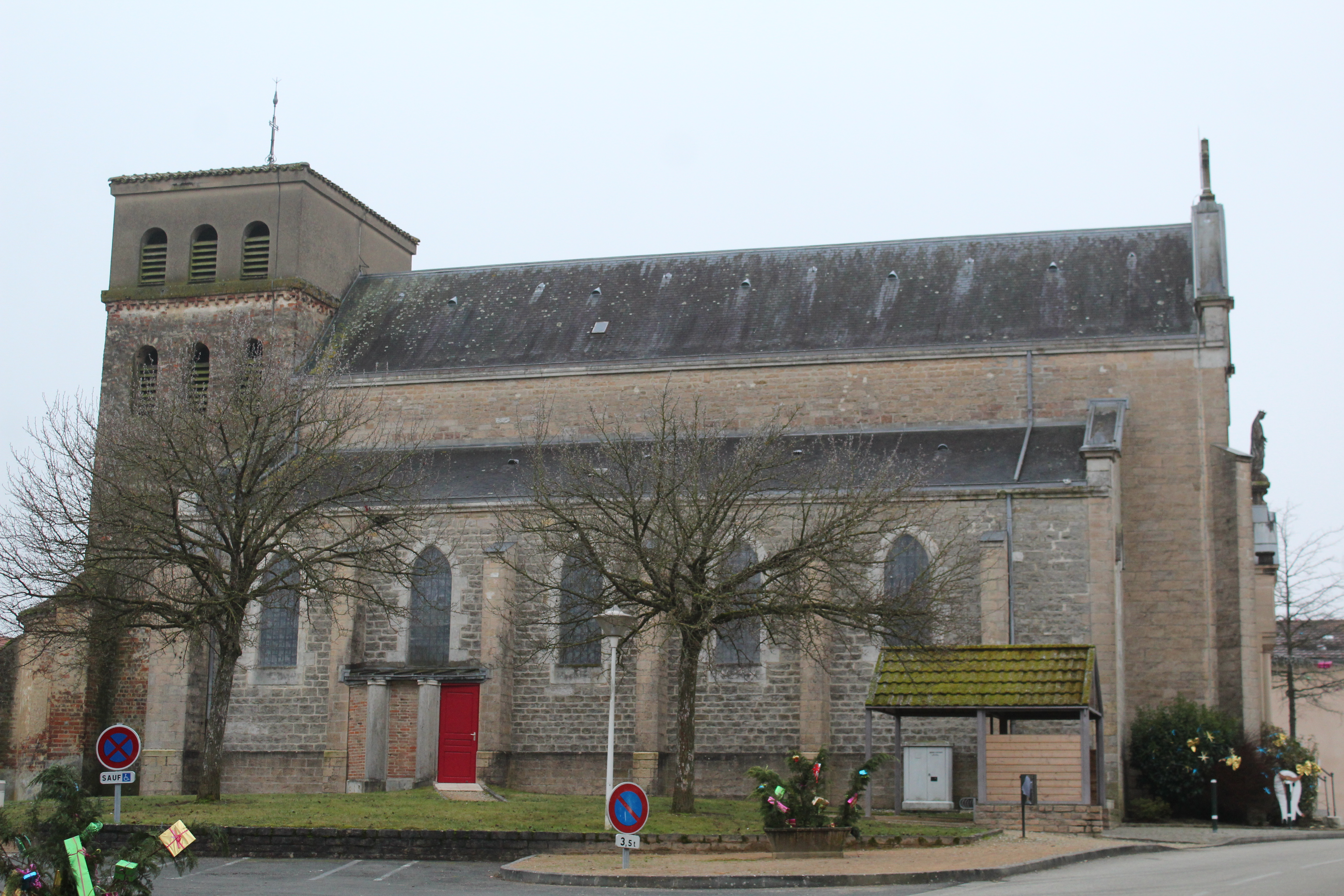
- Location of Saint-Martin-le-Châtel
- Location within France Location within Auvergne-Rhône-Alpes
- Coordinates: 46°16′58″N 5°06′59″E
- Country: France
- Region: Auvergne-Rhône-Alpes
- Department: Ain
- Arrondissement: Bourg-en-Bresse
- Canton: Attignat
- Intercommunality: CA Bassin de Bourg-en-Bresse

Government
  - Mayor (2026–32): Sandrine Dubois
- Area^{1}: 12.77 km^{2} (4.93 sq mi)
- Highest elevation: 225 m (738 ft)
- Lowest elevation: 197 m (646 ft)
- Population (2023): 796
  - Density: 62.3/km^{2} (161/sq mi)
- Time zone: UTC+01:00 (CET)
  - Summer (DST): UTC+02:00 (CEST)
- INSEE/Postal code: 01375 /01310
- ^{1} French Land Register data, which excludes lakes, ponds, glaciers > 1 km^{2} (0.386 sq mi or 247 acres) and river estuaries.

Saint-Martin-le-Châtel (French pronunciation: [sɛ̃ maʁtɛ̃ lə ʃatɛl]) is a commune in the Ain department in eastern France.

== Population ==
Historical population
Year	Pop.	±% p.a.
1968	561	—
1975	498	−1.69%
1982	519	+0.59%
1990	555	+0.84%
1999	652	+1.81%
2007	771	+2.12%
2012	796	+0.64%
2017	787	−0.23%
2023	796	+0.19%
Source: INSEE

== See also ==
- Communes of the Ain department
