= Saint-Sulpice, Ain =

Commune in Auvergne-Rhône-Alpes, France

Saint-Sulpice
- Commune
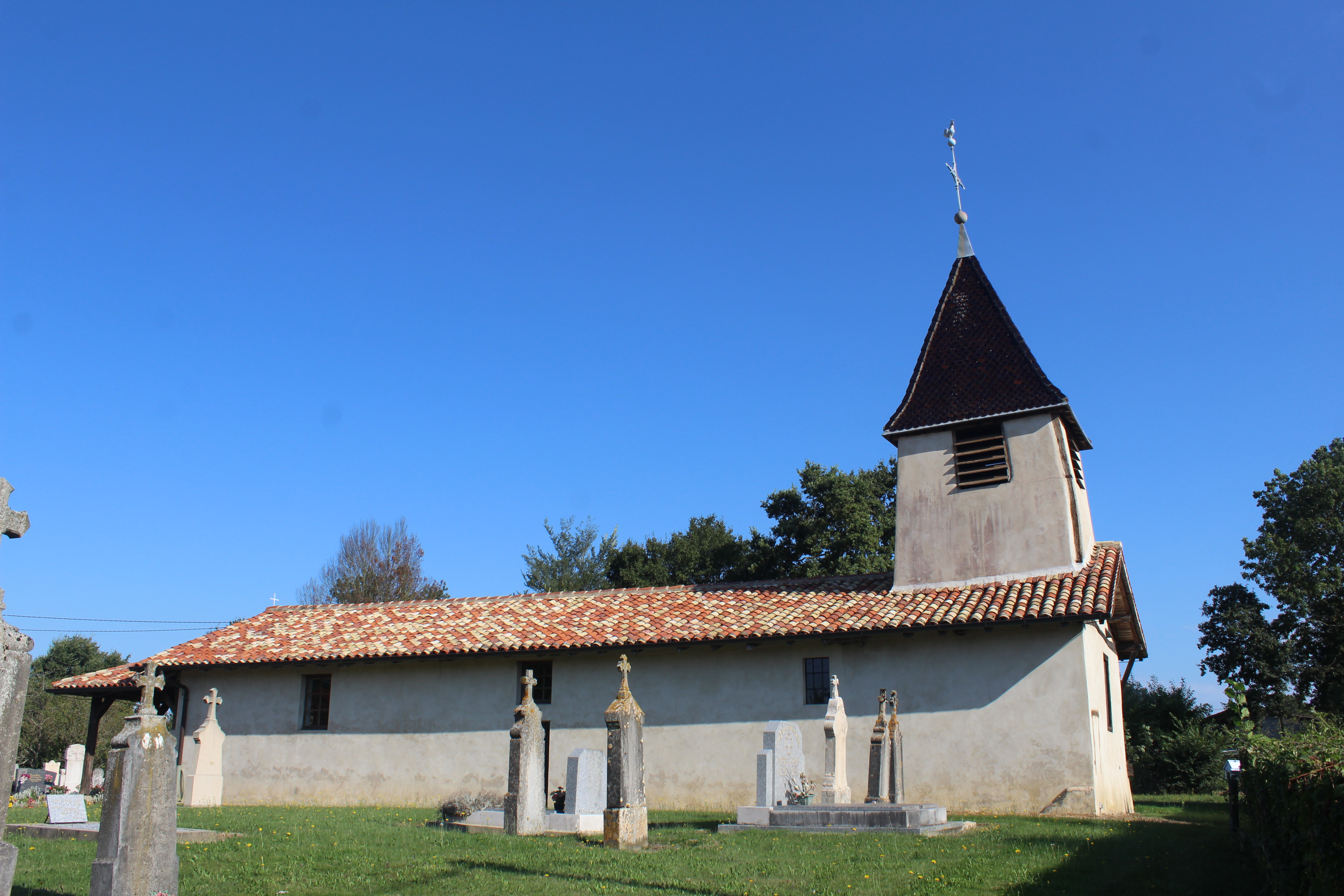

- Coat of arms
- Location of Saint-Sulpice
- Location within France Location within Auvergne-Rhône-Alpes
- Coordinates: 46°19′16″N 5°02′33″E
- Country: France
- Region: Auvergne-Rhône-Alpes
- Department: Ain
- Arrondissement: Bourg-en-Bresse
- Canton: Attignat
- Intercommunality: CA Bassin de Bourg-en-Bresse

Government
  - Mayor (2026–32): Michel Girod
- Area^{1}: 5.26 km^{2} (2.03 sq mi)
- Highest elevation: 217 m (712 ft)
- Lowest elevation: 193 m (633 ft)
- Population (2023): 260
  - Density: 49/km^{2} (130/sq mi)
- Time zone: UTC+01:00 (CET)
  - Summer (DST): UTC+02:00 (CEST)
- INSEE/Postal code: 01387 /01340
- ^{1} French Land Register data, which excludes lakes, ponds, glaciers > 1 km^{2} (0.386 sq mi or 247 acres) and river estuaries.

Saint-Sulpice (French pronunciation: [sɛ̃ sylpis]) is a commune in the Ain department in eastern France.

== Population ==
Historical population
Year	Pop.	±% p.a.
1968	120	—
1975	119	−0.12%
1982	107	−1.51%
1990	102	−0.60%
1999	103	+0.11%
2007	133	+3.25%
2012	173	+5.40%
2017	257	+8.24%
2023	260	+0.19%
Source: INSEE

== See also ==
- Communes of the Ain department
