= Saint-Didier-d'Aussiat =

Commune in Auvergne-Rhône-Alpes, France

Saint-Didier d'Aussiat
- Commune
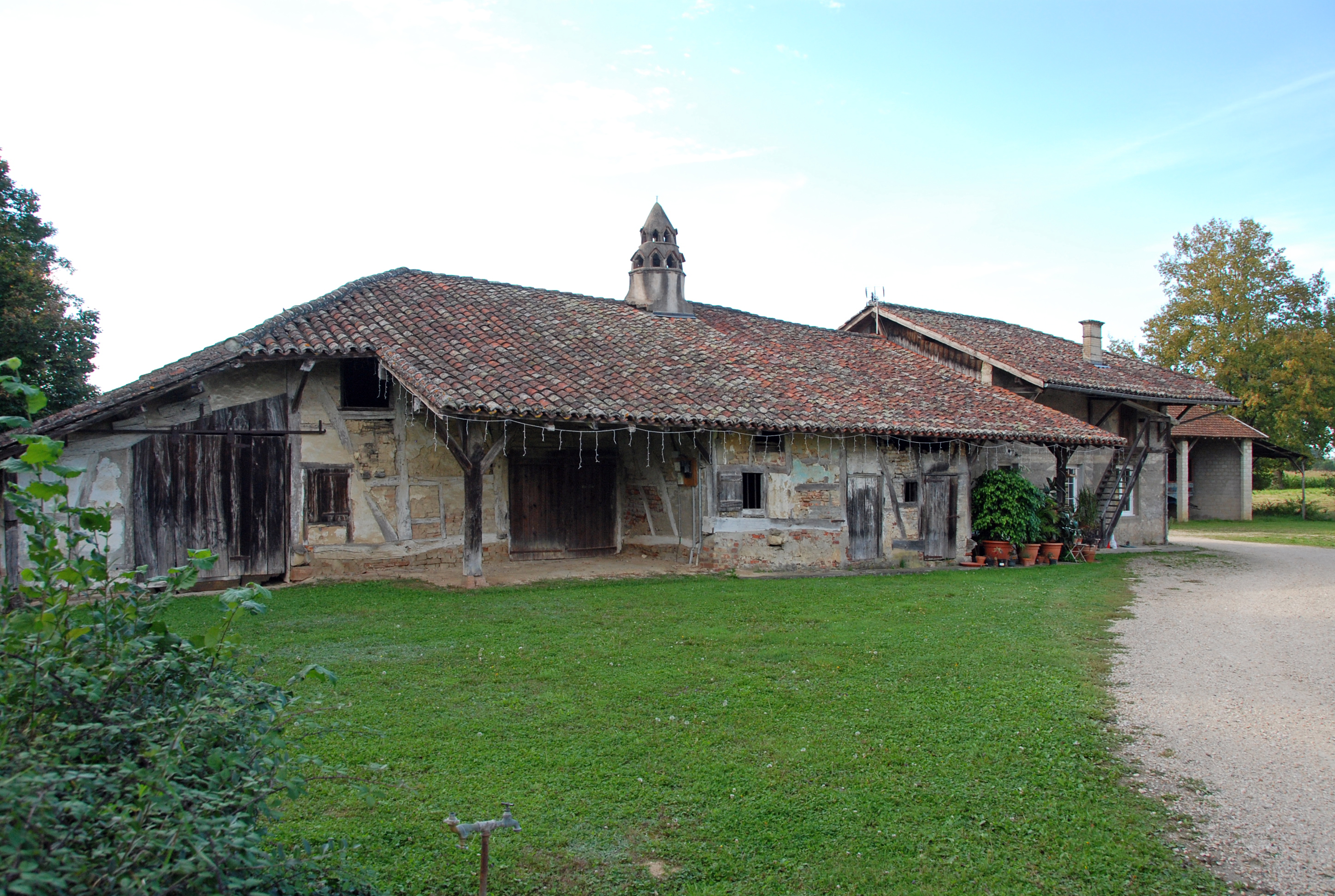
- Cossiat farm

- Coat of arms
- Location of Saint-Didier d'Aussiat
- Location within France Location within Auvergne-Rhône-Alpes
- Coordinates: 46°18′25″N 5°03′42″E
- Country: France
- Region: Auvergne-Rhône-Alpes
- Department: Ain
- Arrondissement: Bourg-en-Bresse
- Canton: Attignat
- Intercommunality: CA Bassin de Bourg-en-Bresse

Government
  - Mayor (2026–32): Dominique Perrot
- Area^{1}: 15.22 km^{2} (5.88 sq mi)
- Highest elevation: 223 m (732 ft)
- Lowest elevation: 194 m (636 ft)
- Population (2023): 843
  - Density: 55.4/km^{2} (143/sq mi)
- Time zone: UTC+01:00 (CET)
  - Summer (DST): UTC+02:00 (CEST)
- INSEE/Postal code: 01346 /01340
- ^{1} French Land Register data, which excludes lakes, ponds, glaciers > 1 km^{2} (0.386 sq mi or 247 acres) and river estuaries.

Saint-Didier-d'Aussiat (French pronunciation: [sɛ̃ didje dosja]) is a commune in the Ain department in eastern France.

== Population ==
Historical population
Year	Pop.	±% p.a.
1968	608	—
1975	582	−0.62%
1982	565	−0.42%
1990	594	+0.63%
1999	666	+1.28%
2007	800	+2.32%
2012	897	+2.32%
2017	871	−0.59%
2023	843	−0.54%
Source: INSEE

== See also ==
- Communes of the Ain department
