= Buellas =

Commune in Auvergne-Rhône-Alpes, France

- Commune
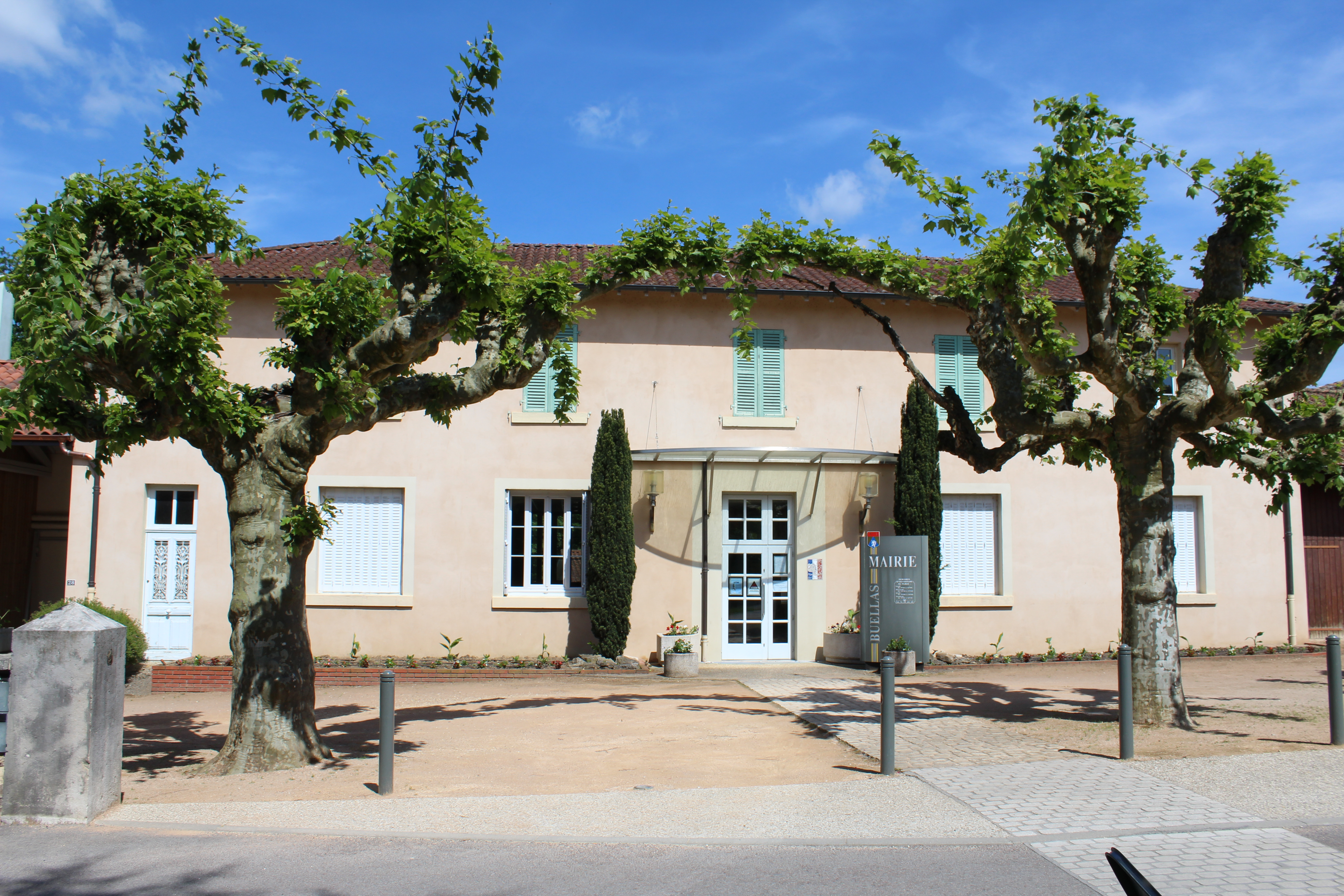
- Town hall

- Coat of arms
- Location of Buellas
- Location within France Location within Auvergne-Rhône-Alpes
- Coordinates: 46°12′00″N 5°08′00″E
- Country: France
- Region: Auvergne-Rhône-Alpes
- Department: Ain
- Arrondissement: Bourg-en-Bresse
- Canton: Attignat
- Intercommunality: Bassin de Bourg-en-Bresse

Government
  - Mayor (2026–32): Nathalie Aznar
- Area^{1}: 10.21 km^{2} (3.94 sq mi)
- Highest elevation: 266 m (873 ft)
- Lowest elevation: 206 m (676 ft)
- Population (2023): 1,899
  - Density: 186.0/km^{2} (481.7/sq mi)
- Time zone: UTC+01:00 (CET)
  - Summer (DST): UTC+02:00 (CEST)
- INSEE/Postal code: 01065 /01310
- Website: https://www.buellas.fr/
- ^{1} French Land Register data, which excludes lakes, ponds, glaciers > 1 km^{2} (0.386 sq mi or 247 acres) and river estuaries.

Buellas (French pronunciation: [bɥɛlas]; Arpitan: Bouèla) is a commune in the eastern French department of Ain.

== Geography ==
Buellas is located between the plain of Bresse and the plateau of Dombes. The Veyle forms the commune's northeastern border.

== Population ==
Historical population
Year	Pop.	±% p.a.
1968	687	—
1975	792	+2.05%
1982	1,006	+3.48%
1990	1,162	+1.82%
1999	1,288	+1.15%
2007	1,633	+3.01%
2012	1,714	+0.97%
2017	1,782	+0.78%
2023	1,899	+1.07%
Source: INSEE

== Sights ==
- Parc botanique de la Teyssonnière, a botanical park

== See also ==
- Communes of the Ain department
