= Béréziat =

Commune in Auvergne-Rhône-Alpes, France

- Commune
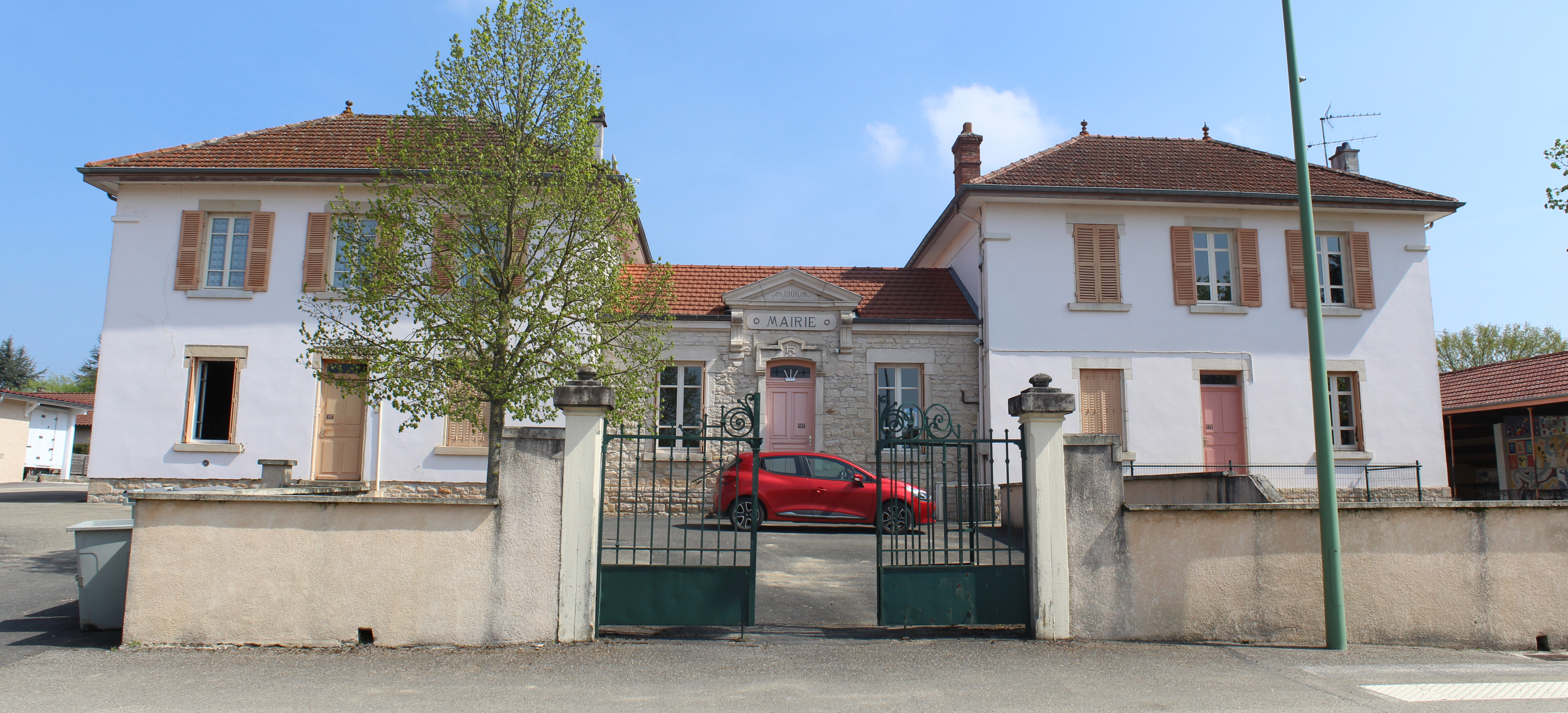
- Town hall
- Location of Béréziat
- Location within France Location within Auvergne-Rhône-Alpes
- Coordinates: 46°22′04″N 5°02′48″E
- Country: France
- Region: Auvergne-Rhône-Alpes
- Department: Ain
- Arrondissement: Bourg-en-Bresse
- Canton: Attignat
- Intercommunality: Bassin de Bourg-en-Bresse

Government
  - Mayor (2026–32): Franck Berardan
- Area^{1}: 10.83 km^{2} (4.18 sq mi)
- Highest elevation: 213 m (699 ft)
- Lowest elevation: 185 m (607 ft)
- Population (2023): 475
  - Density: 43.9/km^{2} (114/sq mi)
- Time zone: UTC+01:00 (CET)
  - Summer (DST): UTC+02:00 (CEST)
- INSEE/Postal code: 01040 /01340
- Website: https://commune-bereziat.fr/
- ^{1} French Land Register data, which excludes lakes, ponds, glaciers > 1 km^{2} (0.386 sq mi or 247 acres) and river estuaries.

Béréziat (French pronunciation: [beʁezja]) is a commune in the eastern French department of Ain.

== Population ==
Historical population
Year	Pop.	±% p.a.
1968	298	—
1975	284	−0.69%
1982	282	−0.10%
1990	308	+1.11%
1999	340	+1.10%
2007	359	+0.68%
2012	463	+5.22%
2017	496	+1.39%
2023	475	−0.72%
Source: INSEE

== See also ==
- Communes of the Ain department
