= Montcet =

Commune in Auvergne-Rhône-Alpes, France

- Commune
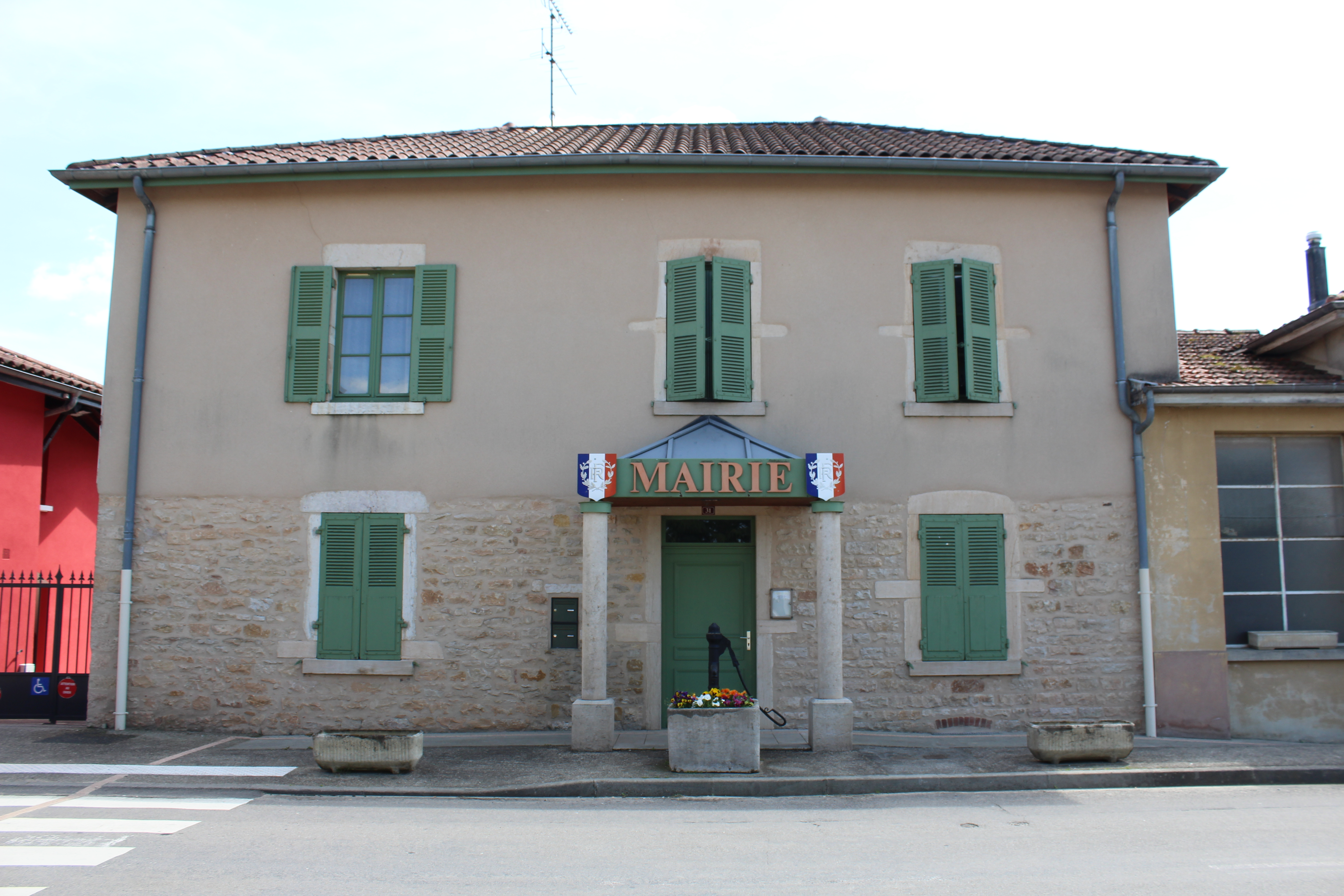
- Town hall
- Location of Montcet
- Location within France Location within Auvergne-Rhône-Alpes
- Coordinates: 46°12′48″N 5°06′47″E
- Country: France
- Region: Auvergne-Rhône-Alpes
- Department: Ain
- Arrondissement: Bourg-en-Bresse
- Canton: Attignat
- Intercommunality: CA Bassin de Bourg-en-Bresse

Government
  - Mayor (2026–32): Franck Tarpin
- Area^{1}: 6.68 km^{2} (2.58 sq mi)
- Elevation: 250 m (820 ft)
- Highest elevation: 247 m (810 ft)
- Lowest elevation: 200 m (660 ft)
- Population (2023): 709
  - Density: 106/km^{2} (275/sq mi)
- Time zone: UTC+01:00 (CET)
  - Summer (DST): UTC+02:00 (CEST)
- INSEE/Postal code: 01259 /01310
- ^{1} French Land Register data, which excludes lakes, ponds, glaciers > 1 km^{2} (0.386 sq mi or 247 acres) and river estuaries.

Montcet (French pronunciation: [mɔ̃sɛ]) is a commune in the Ain department in eastern France.

== Population ==
Historical population
Year	Pop.	±% p.a.
1968	311	—
1975	282	−1.39%
1982	290	+0.40%
1990	420	+4.74%
1999	489	+1.70%
2007	662	+3.86%
2012	655	−0.21%
2017	691	+1.08%
2023	709	+0.43%
Source: INSEE

== See also ==
- Communes of the Ain department
