= Polliat =

Commune in Auvergne-Rhône-Alpes, France

- Commune
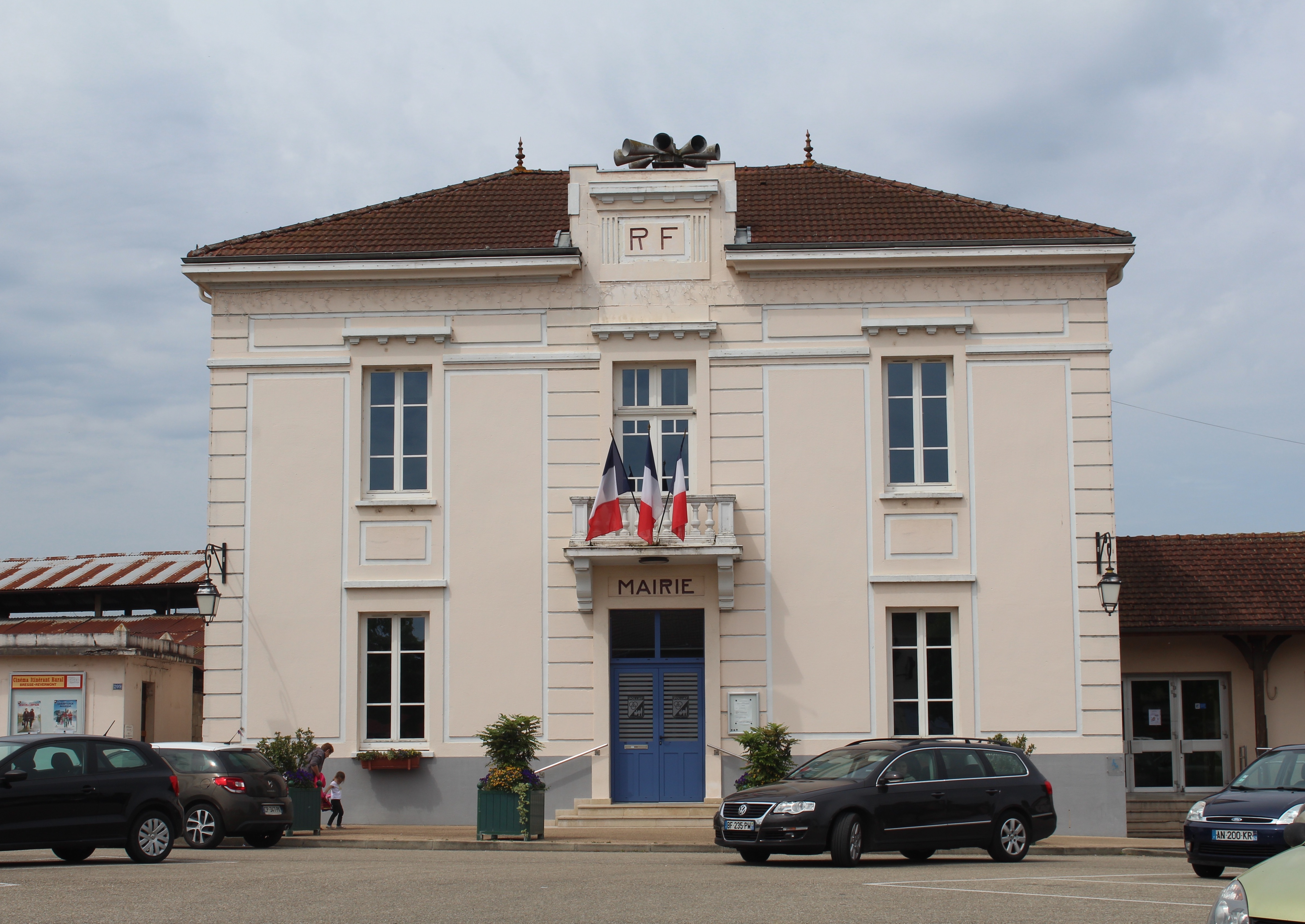
- Town hall

- Coat of arms
- Location of Polliat
- Location within France Location within Auvergne-Rhône-Alpes
- Coordinates: 46°15′00″N 5°07′36″E
- Country: France
- Region: Auvergne-Rhône-Alpes
- Department: Ain
- Arrondissement: Bourg-en-Bresse
- Canton: Attignat
- Intercommunality: CA Bassin de Bourg-en-Bresse

Government
  - Mayor (2026–32): Bernard Bienvenu
- Area^{1}: 20.07 km^{2} (7.75 sq mi)
- Highest elevation: 233 m (764 ft)
- Lowest elevation: 198 m (650 ft)
- Population (2023): 2,741
  - Density: 136.6/km^{2} (353.7/sq mi)
- Time zone: UTC+01:00 (CET)
  - Summer (DST): UTC+02:00 (CEST)
- INSEE/Postal code: 01301 /01310
- ^{1} French Land Register data, which excludes lakes, ponds, glaciers > 1 km^{2} (0.386 sq mi or 247 acres) and river estuaries.

Polliat (French pronunciation: [pɔlja]) is a commune in the Ain department in eastern France.

== Geography ==
The Veyle flows west through the southern part of the commune.

== Population ==
Historical population
Year	Pop.	±% p.a.
1968	1,362	—
1975	1,558	+1.94%
1982	1,841	+2.41%
1990	2,025	+1.20%
1999	2,019	−0.03%
2007	2,336	+1.84%
2012	2,374	+0.32%
2017	2,511	+1.13%
2023	2,741	+1.47%
Source: INSEE

== See also ==
- Communes of the Ain department
