= Malafretaz =

Commune in Auvergne-Rhône-Alpes, France

Malafretaz Monlafretât (Arpitan)
- Commune
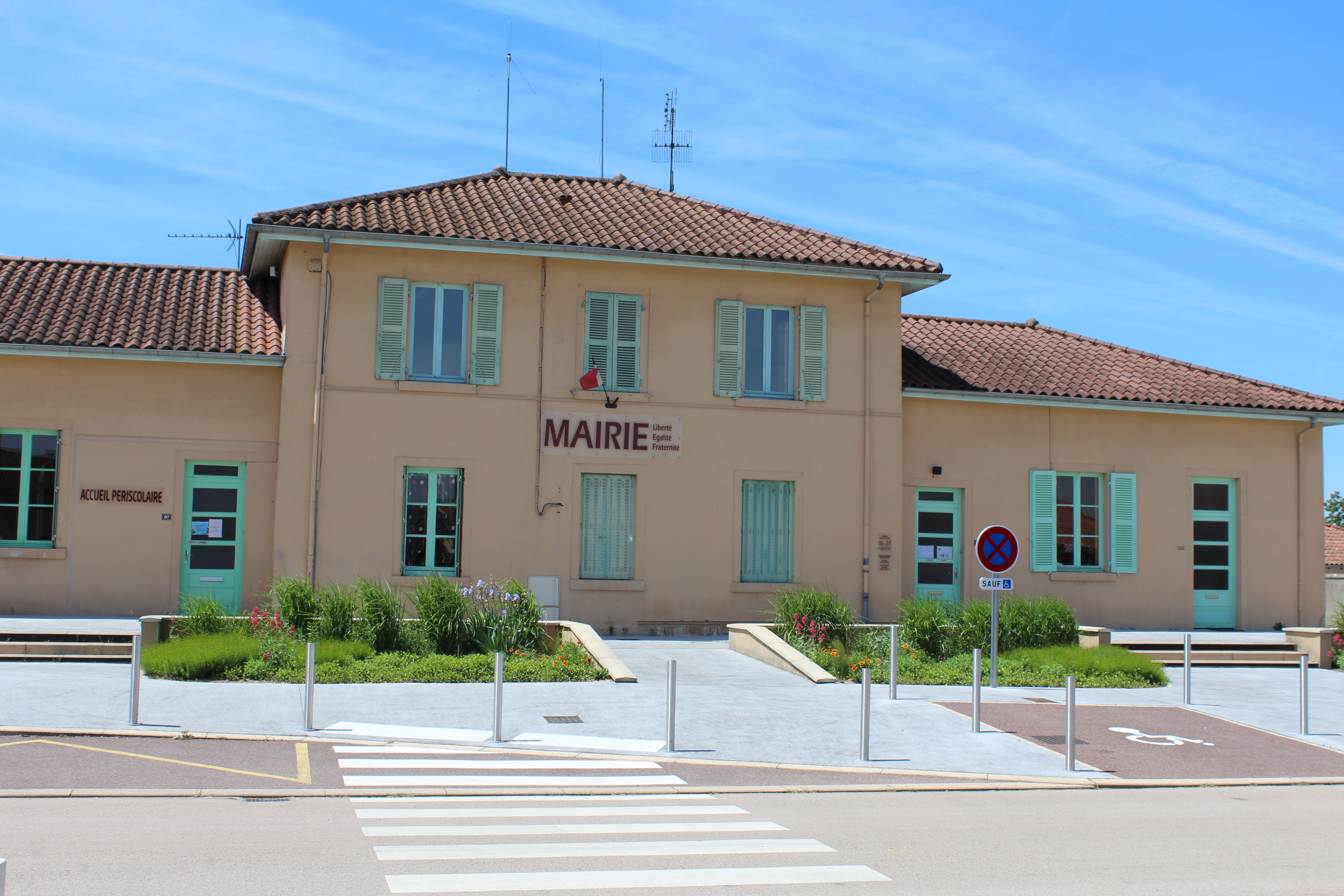
- Town hall
- Location of Malafretaz
- Location within France Location within Auvergne-Rhône-Alpes
- Coordinates: 46°19′29″N 5°08′51″E
- Country: France
- Region: Auvergne-Rhône-Alpes
- Department: Ain
- Arrondissement: Bourg-en-Bresse
- Canton: Attignat
- Intercommunality: CA Bassin de Bourg-en-Bresse

Government
  - Mayor (2026–32): Gary Leroux
- Area^{1}: 9.19 km^{2} (3.55 sq mi)
- Highest elevation: 223 m (732 ft)
- Lowest elevation: 190 m (620 ft)
- Population (2023): 1,257
  - Density: 137/km^{2} (354/sq mi)
- Time zone: UTC+01:00 (CET)
  - Summer (DST): UTC+02:00 (CEST)
- INSEE/Postal code: 01229 /01340
- ^{1} French Land Register data, which excludes lakes, ponds, glaciers > 1 km^{2} (0.386 sq mi or 247 acres) and river estuaries.

Malafretaz (Arpitan: Monlafretât) is a commune in the Ain department in eastern France.

== Population ==
Historical population
Year	Pop.	±% p.a.
1968	526	—
1975	549	+0.61%
1982	530	−0.50%
1990	624	+2.06%
1999	674	+0.86%
2007	864	+3.15%
2012	1,076	+4.49%
2017	1,216	+2.48%
2023	1,257	+0.55%
Source: INSEE

== See also ==
- Communes of the Ain department
