= Jayat =

Commune in Auvergne-Rhône-Alpes, France

- Commune
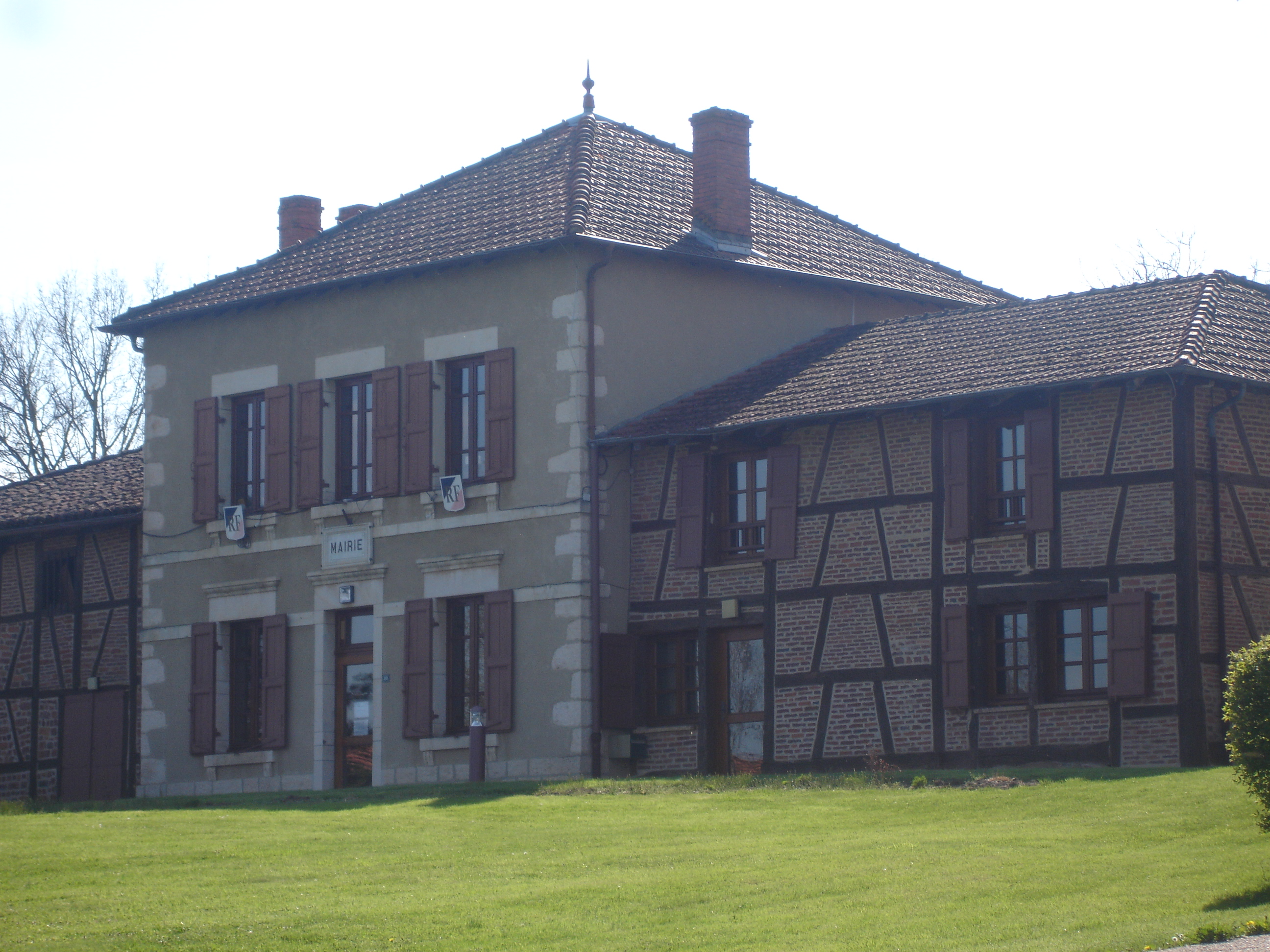
- Town hall
- Location of Jayat
- Location within France Location within Auvergne-Rhône-Alpes
- Coordinates: 46°22′17″N 5°07′18″E
- Country: France
- Region: Auvergne-Rhône-Alpes
- Department: Ain
- Arrondissement: Bourg-en-Bresse
- Canton: Attignat
- Intercommunality: CA Bassin de Bourg-en-Bresse

Government
  - Mayor (2026–32): Mickaël Morel
- Area^{1}: 16.3 km^{2} (6.3 sq mi)
- Highest elevation: 218 m (715 ft)
- Lowest elevation: 183 m (600 ft)
- Population (2023): 1,261
  - Density: 77.4/km^{2} (200/sq mi)
- Time zone: UTC+01:00 (CET)
  - Summer (DST): UTC+02:00 (CEST)
- INSEE/Postal code: 01196 /01340
- ^{1} French Land Register data, which excludes lakes, ponds, glaciers > 1 km^{2} (0.386 sq mi or 247 acres) and river estuaries.

Jayat is a commune in the eastern French department of Ain.

== Population ==
Historical population
Year	Pop.	±% p.a.
1968	713	—
1975	698	−0.30%
1982	681	−0.35%
1990	650	−0.58%
1999	773	+1.94%
2007	993	+3.18%
2012	1,091	+1.90%
2017	1,182	+1.62%
2023	1,261	+1.08%
Source: INSEE

== See also ==
- Communes of the Ain department
