= Marsonnas =

Commune in Auvergne-Rhône-Alpes, France

- Commune
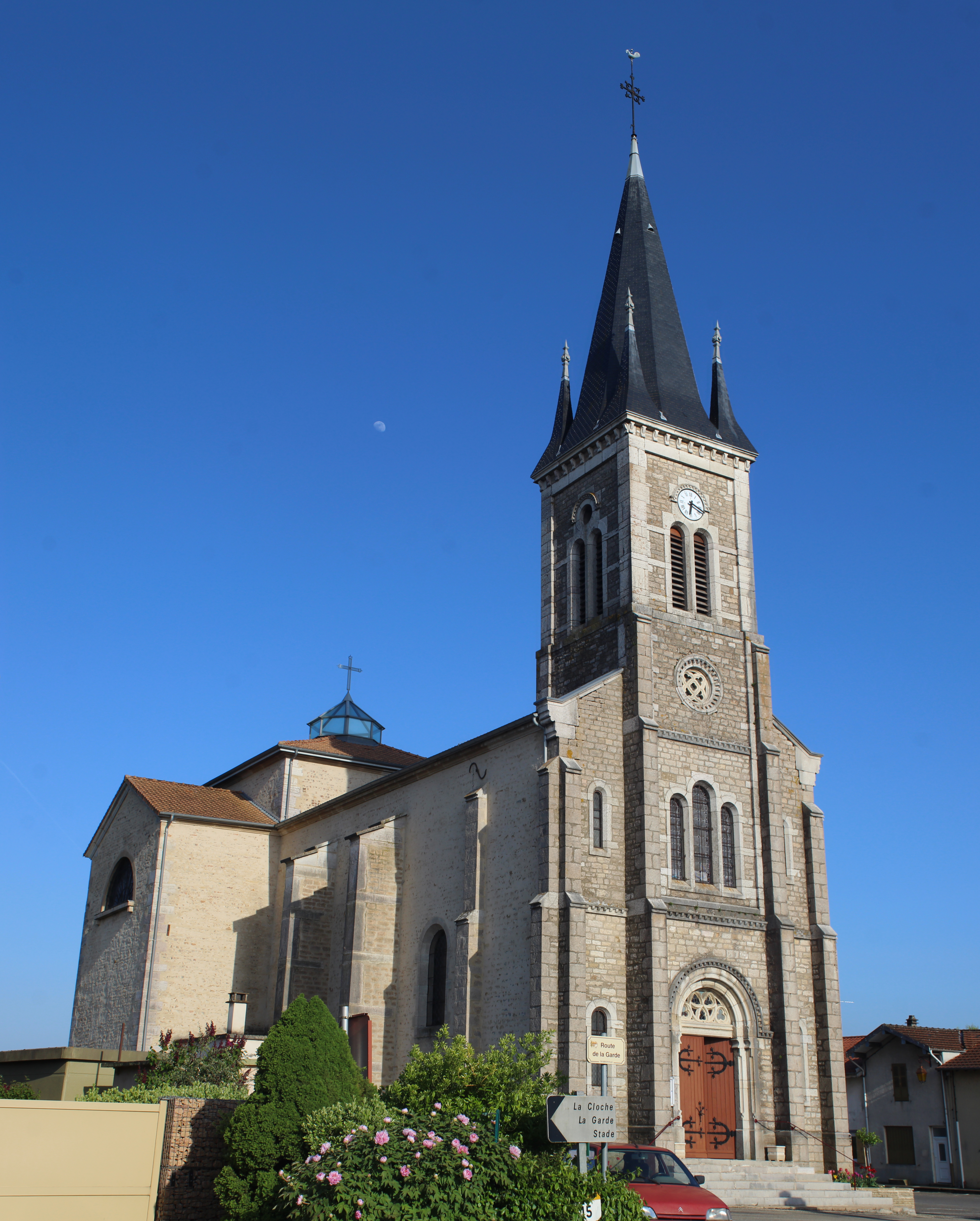
- Location of Marsonnas
- Location within France Location within Auvergne-Rhône-Alpes
- Coordinates: 46°20′30″N 5°04′19″E
- Country: France
- Region: Auvergne-Rhône-Alpes
- Department: Ain
- Arrondissement: Bourg-en-Bresse
- Canton: Attignat
- Intercommunality: CA Bassin de Bourg-en-Bresse

Government
  - Mayor (2026–32): Sandrine Thevenard
- Area^{1}: 18.38 km^{2} (7.10 sq mi)
- Highest elevation: 222 m (728 ft)
- Lowest elevation: 189 m (620 ft)
- Population (2023): 1,039
  - Density: 56.53/km^{2} (146.4/sq mi)
- Time zone: UTC+01:00 (CET)
  - Summer (DST): UTC+02:00 (CEST)
- INSEE/Postal code: 01236 /01340
- ^{1} French Land Register data, which excludes lakes, ponds, glaciers > 1 km^{2} (0.386 sq mi or 247 acres) and river estuaries.

Marsonnas (French pronunciation: [maʁsɔna]) is a commune in the eastern French department of Ain.

== Population ==
Historical population
Year	Pop.	±% p.a.
1968	702	—
1975	683	−0.39%
1982	734	+1.03%
1990	728	−0.10%
1999	727	−0.02%
2007	889	+2.55%
2012	1,009	+2.56%
2017	991	−0.36%
2023	1,039	+0.79%
Source: INSEE

== See also ==
- Communes of the Ain department
