= Attignat =

Commune in Auvergne-Rhône-Alpes, France

- Commune
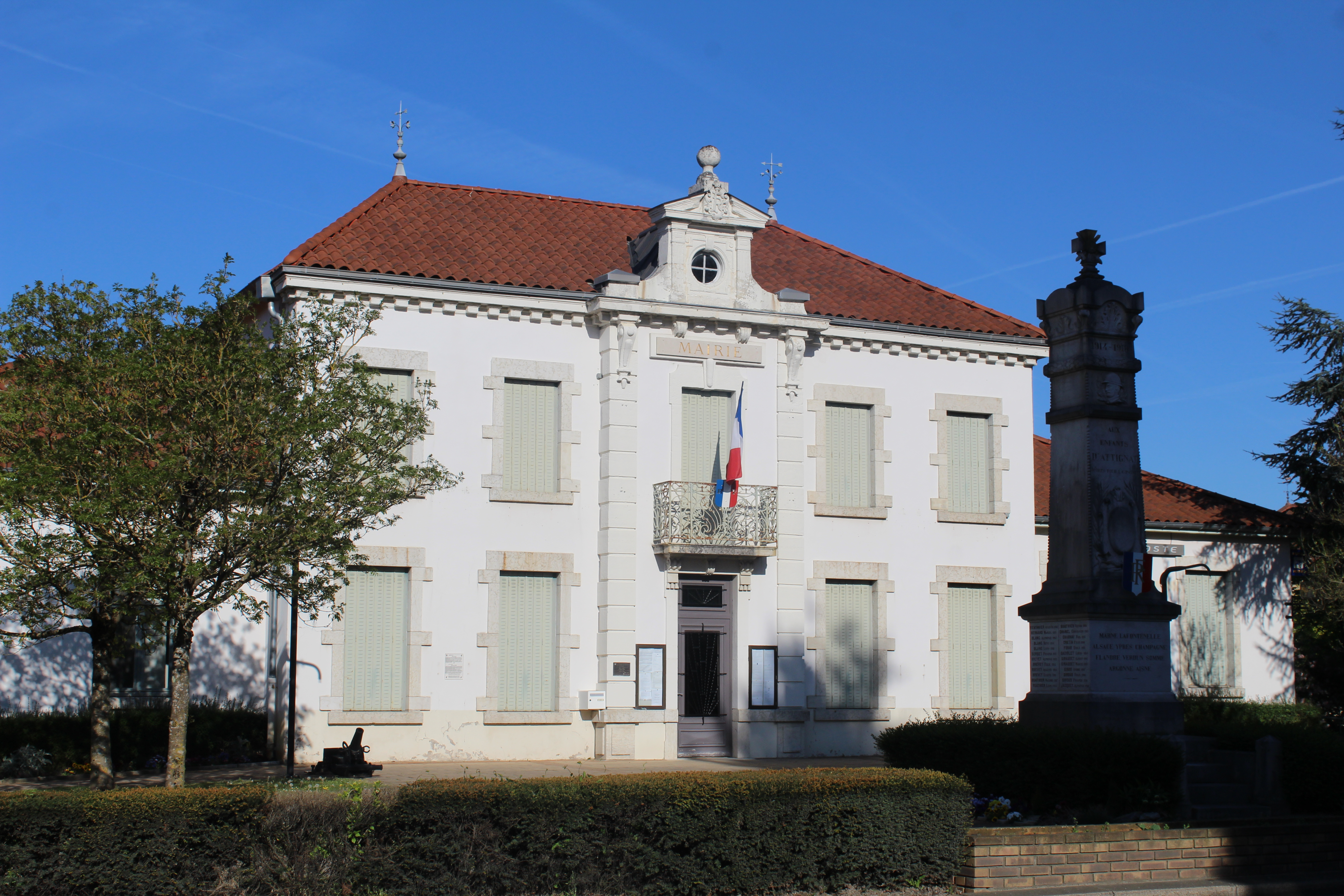
- Town hall

- Coat of arms
- Location of Attignat
- Location within France Location within Auvergne-Rhône-Alpes
- Coordinates: 46°17′17″N 5°09′38″E
- Country: France
- Region: Auvergne-Rhône-Alpes
- Department: Ain
- Arrondissement: Bourg-en-Bresse
- Canton: Attignat
- Intercommunality: CA Bassin de Bourg-en-Bresse

Government
  - Mayor (2026–32): Walter Martin
- Area^{1}: 18.69 km^{2} (7.22 sq mi)
- Highest elevation: 233 m (764 ft)
- Lowest elevation: 199 m (653 ft)
- Population (2023): 3,409
  - Density: 182.4/km^{2} (472.4/sq mi)
- Time zone: UTC+01:00 (CET)
  - Summer (DST): UTC+02:00 (CEST)
- INSEE/Postal code: 01024 /01340
- Website: https://www.attignat.fr/
- ^{1} French Land Register data, which excludes lakes, ponds, glaciers > 1 km^{2} (0.386 sq mi or 247 acres) and river estuaries.

Attignat (French pronunciation: [atiɲa]; Arpitan: Ategnat) is a commune in the eastern French department of Ain.

== Administration ==
Since 2014, Walter Martin has been the mayor of Attignat. He was re-elected in the 2020 municipal elections and in 2026.

== Geography ==
The commune is 12 km northwest of Bourg-en-Bresse, 4 km north of the A40. The Reyssouze runs through the commune.

== Population ==
Historical population
Year	Pop.	±% p.a.
1968	1,236	—
1975	1,279	+0.49%
1982	1,682	+3.99%
1990	1,776	+0.68%
1999	1,924	+0.89%
2007	2,567	+3.67%
2012	3,110	+3.91%
2017	3,211	+0.64%
2023	3,409	+1.00%
Source: INSEE

== See also ==
- Communes of the Ain department
