= Confrançon =

Commune in Auvergne-Rhône-Alpes, France

- Commune
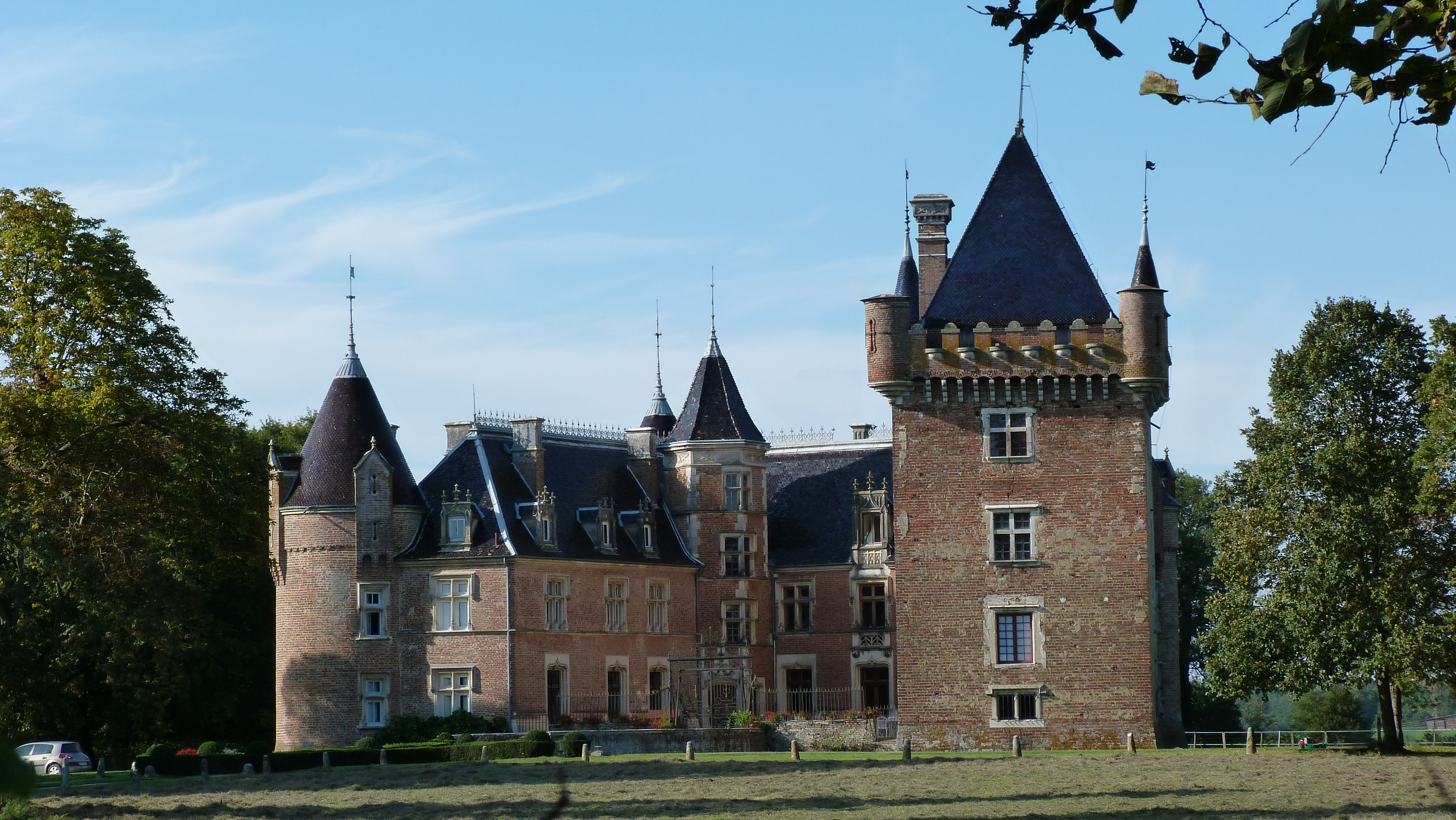
- Loriol chateau
- Location of Confrançon
- Location within France Location within Auvergne-Rhône-Alpes
- Coordinates: 46°16′05″N 5°03′57″E
- Country: France
- Region: Auvergne-Rhône-Alpes
- Department: Ain
- Arrondissement: Bourg-en-Bresse
- Canton: Attignat
- Intercommunality: CA Bassin de Bourg-en-Bresse

Government
  - Mayor (2026–32): Jean-Paul Buellet
- Area^{1}: 18.17 km^{2} (7.02 sq mi)
- Highest elevation: 224 m (735 ft)
- Lowest elevation: 192 m (630 ft)
- Population (2023): 1,356
  - Density: 74.63/km^{2} (193.3/sq mi)
- Time zone: UTC+01:00 (CET)
  - Summer (DST): UTC+02:00 (CEST)
- INSEE/Postal code: 01115 /01310
- ^{1} French Land Register data, which excludes lakes, ponds, glaciers > 1 km^{2} (0.386 sq mi or 247 acres) and river estuaries.

Confrançon (French pronunciation: [kɔ̃fʁɑ̃sɔ̃]) is a commune in the Ain department in eastern France.

== Population ==
Historical population
Year	Pop.	±% p.a.
1968	657	—
1975	725	+1.42%
1982	720	−0.10%
1990	805	+1.40%
1999	862	+0.76%
2007	1,059	+2.61%
2012	1,245	+3.29%
2017	1,336	+1.42%
2023	1,356	+0.25%
Source: INSEE

== See also ==
- Communes of the Ain department
