= Canton of Attignat =

Coordinates: 46.29°N 5.16°E

Attignat
- Canton
- Interactive map of Attignat
- Country: France
- Region: Auvergne-Rhône-Alpes
- Department: Ain
- No. of communes: {{{nbcomm}}}

Government
  - Representatives (2021–2028): Clotilde Fournier; Walter Martin
- Area: 274.75 km^{2} (106.08 sq mi)
- Population (2023): 25,785
  - Density: 93.849/km^{2} (243.07/sq mi)
- INSEE code: 01 02

The canton of Attignat is an administrative division of the Ain department, in eastern France. It was created at the French canton reorganisation which came into effect in March 2015. Its seat is in Attignat. The population of the canton was 25,242, as of January 2021.

== Composition ==
It consists of the following communes:

1. Attignat
2. Béréziat
3. Bresse Vallons
4. Buellas
5. Confrançon
6. Curtafond
7. Foissiat
8. Jayat
9. Malafretaz
10. Marsonnas
11. Montcet
12. Montracol
13. Montrevel-en-Bresse
14. Polliat
15. Saint-Didier-d'Aussiat
16. Saint-Martin-le-Châtel
17. Saint-Sulpice
18. Vandeins

== Councillors ==
Election	Councillors	Party	Occupation
2015	Clotilde Fournier	DVD	Mayor of Saint-Sulpice
2015	Walter Martin	DVD	Mayor of Attignat

== Pictures of the canton ==
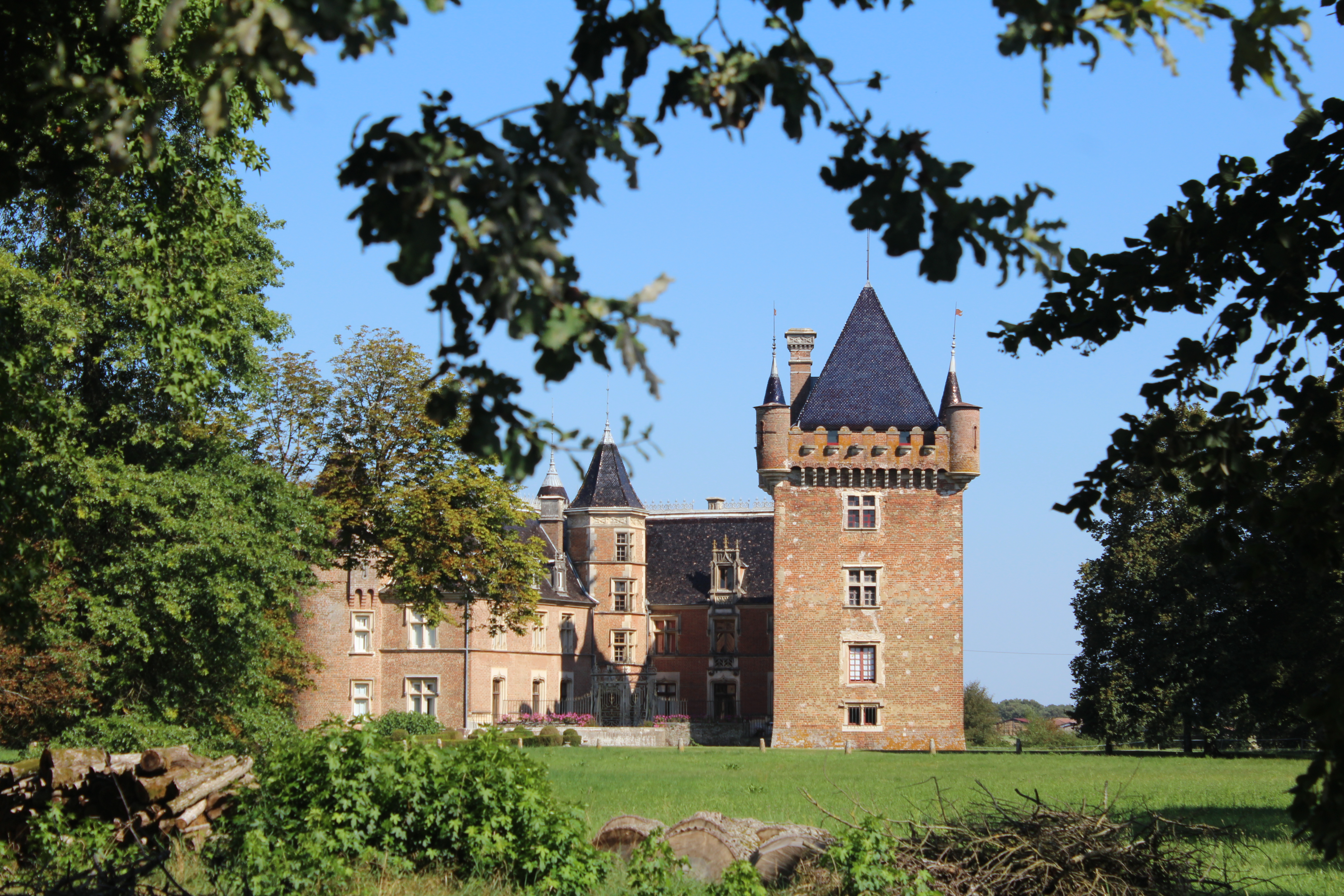
Loriol Castle in Confrançon

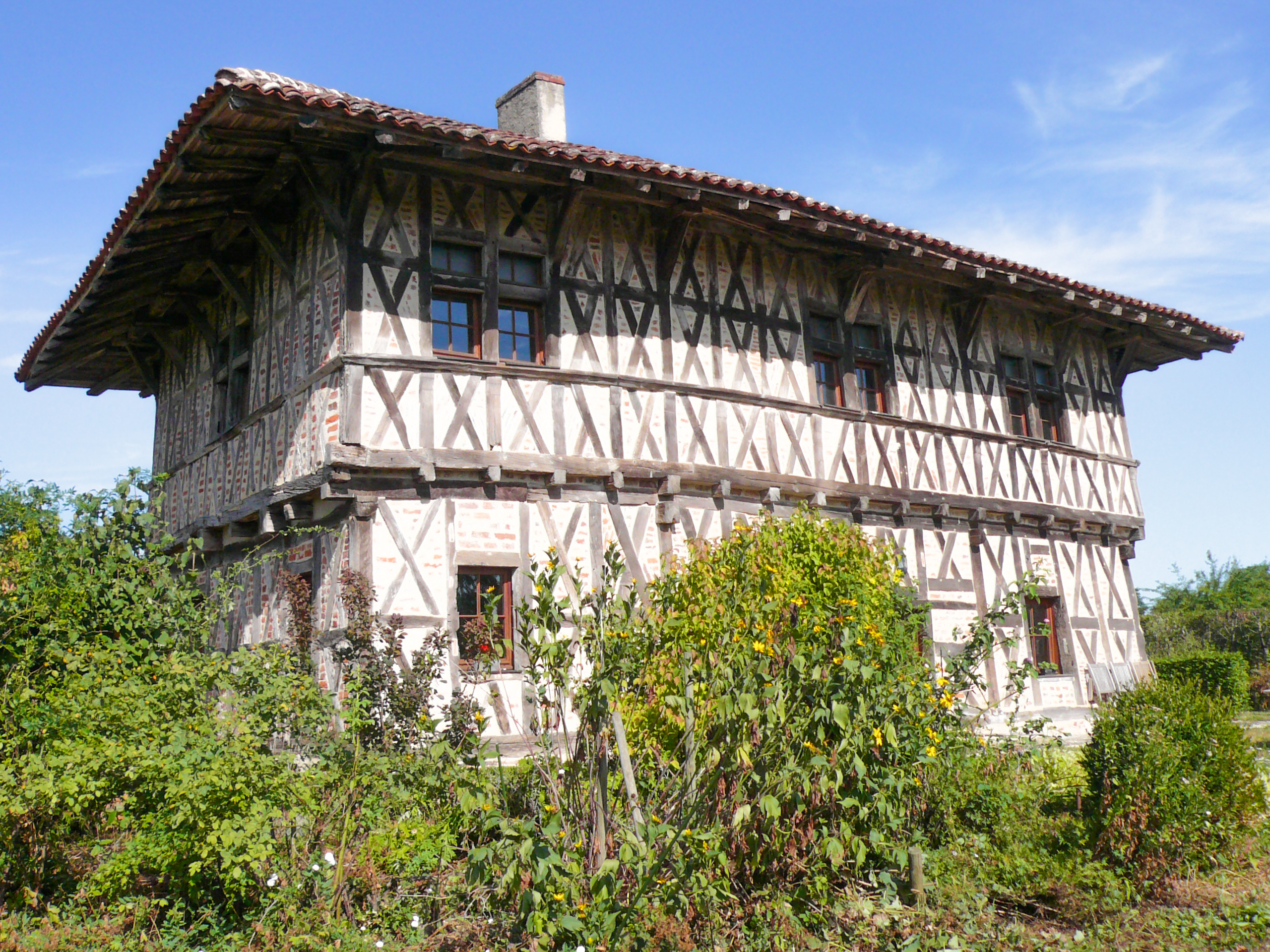
Manoir de la Charme in Montrevel-en-Bresse

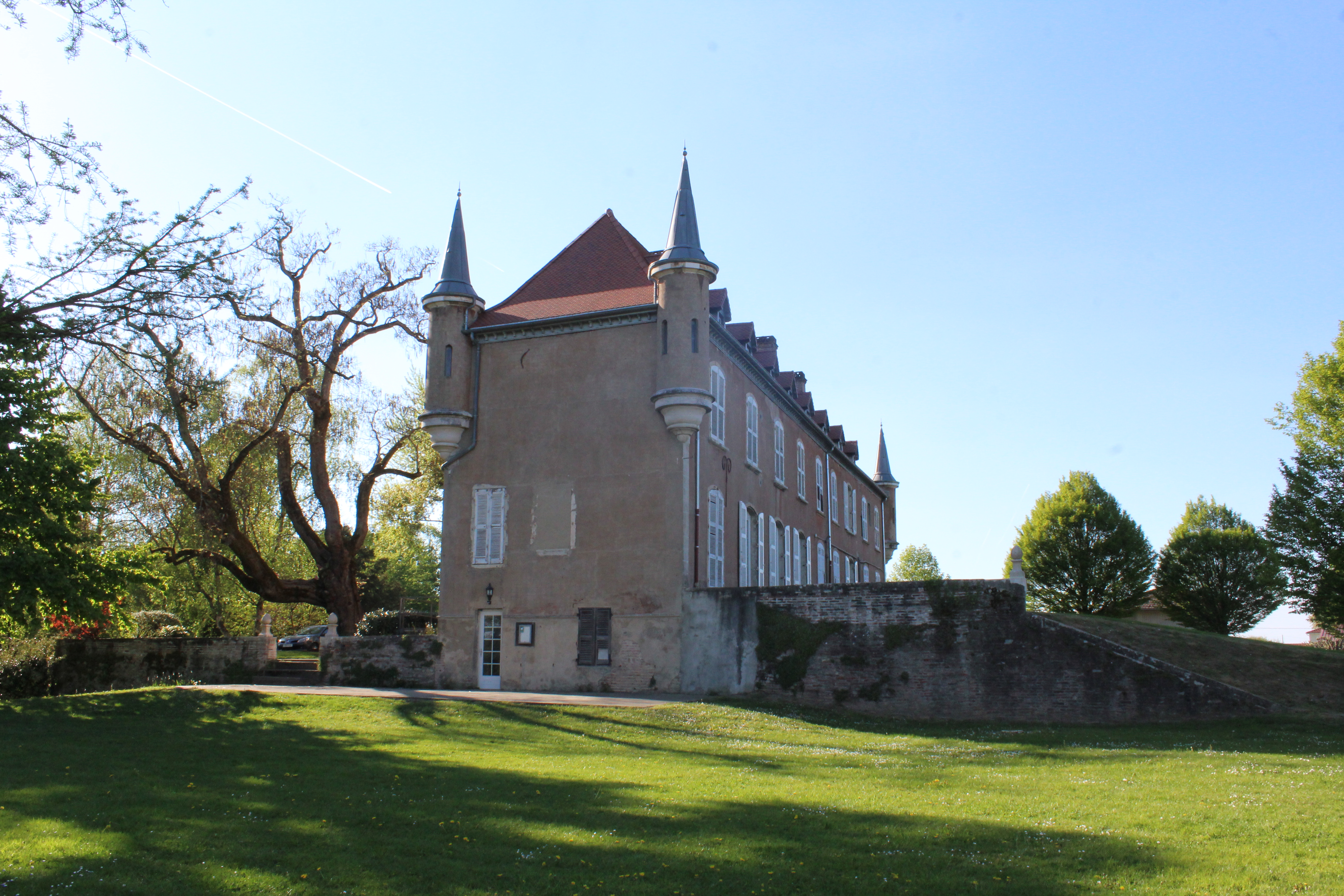
Castle of Salvert in Attignat
