= Arbigny =

Commune in Auvergne-Rhône-Alpes, France

- Commune
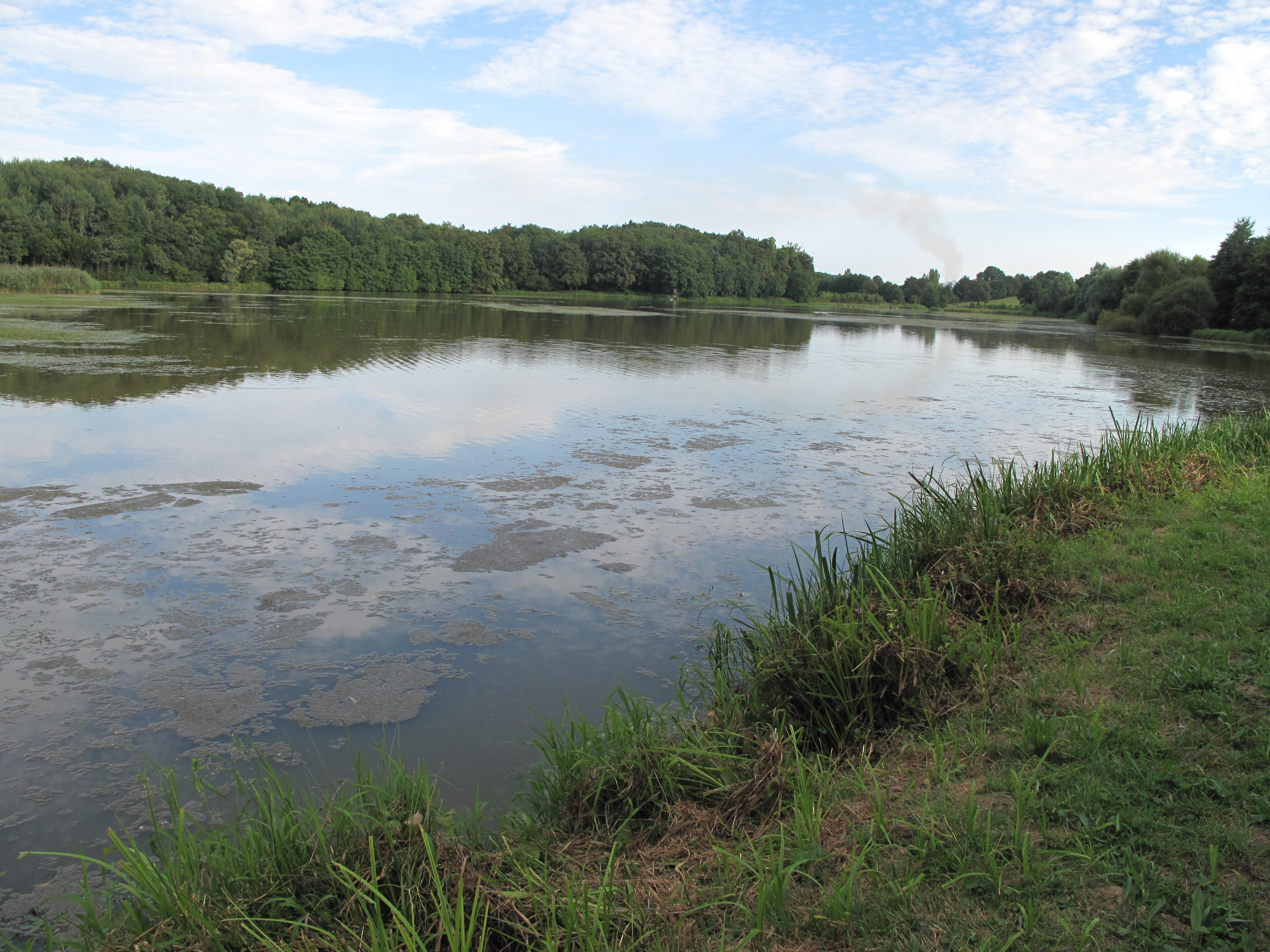
- The Grand-Étang near Arbigny
- Location of Arbigny
- Location within France Location within Auvergne-Rhône-Alpes
- Coordinates: 46°28′14″N 4°57′48″E
- Country: France
- Region: Auvergne-Rhône-Alpes
- Department: Ain
- Arrondissement: Bourg-en-Bresse
- Canton: Replonges
- Intercommunality: Bresse et Saône

Government
  - Mayor (2026–32): Nadine Gasse
- Area^{1}: 17.47 km^{2} (6.75 sq mi)
- Elevation: 200 m (660 ft)
- Highest elevation: 214 m (702 ft)
- Lowest elevation: 169 m (554 ft)
- Population (2023): 462
  - Density: 26.4/km^{2} (68.5/sq mi)
- Time zone: UTC+01:00 (CET)
  - Summer (DST): UTC+02:00 (CEST)
- INSEE/Postal code: 01016 /01190
- ^{1} French Land Register data, which excludes lakes, ponds, glaciers > 1 km^{2} (0.386 sq mi or 247 acres) and river estuaries.

Arbigny (French pronunciation: [aʁbiɲi]) is a commune in the Ain department in the Auvergne-Rhône-Alpes region of eastern France.

== Geography ==
Arbigny is some 20 km north of Mâcon and 40 km south by south-east of Chalon-sur-Saône. The commune can be accessed by the D933 from Sermoyer in the north passing through the centre of the commune and village and continuing south to Pont-de-Vaux. The D126 runs west from the village changing to the D163 at the border of the commune and continuing to Uchizy. There are two other hamlets in the commune - La Croix and La Varenne. About 80% of the commune is farmland with the rest being the forested eastern part.

The western border of the commune is formed by the Saône river. In the north and east there are ponds which are drained by the Biel d'Etang Neuf and the Biel d'Etang Butière which flow west to the Saône.

== History ==
The area has been occupied since prehistoric times. The village was known as Albiniacus in the Middle Ages.

== Administration ==
List of mayors of Arbigny

From	To	Name
1995	2008	Christian Berardet
2008	2014	Michel Vieux
2014	2020	Sylvain Berardet
2020	2026	Daniel Gras
2026	incumbent	Nadine Gasse

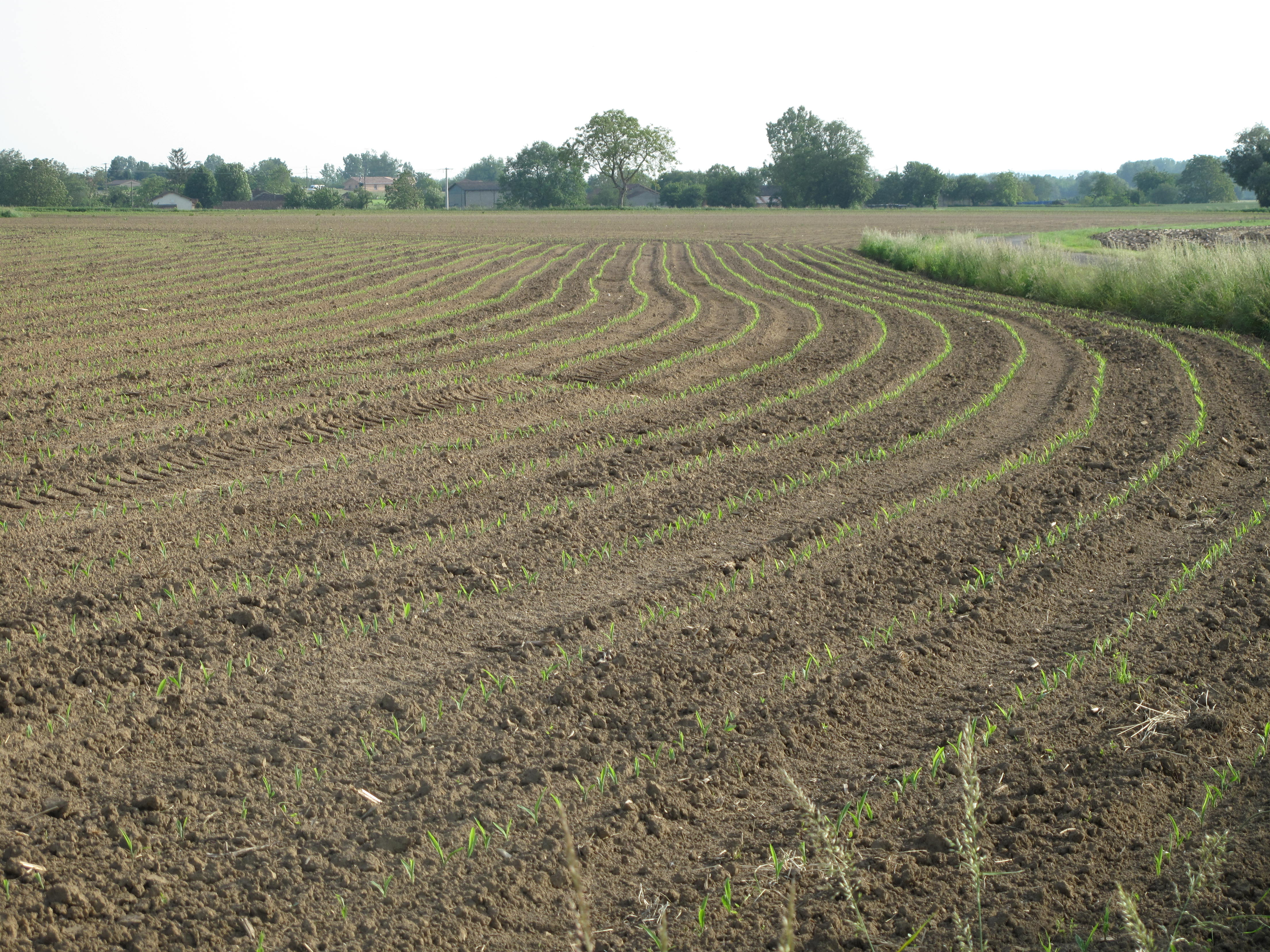
Maize seedlings

== Population ==
Historical population
Year	Pop.	±% p.a.
1968	353	—
1975	334	−0.79%
1982	311	−1.01%
1990	314	+0.12%
1999	332	+0.62%
2007	352	+0.73%
2012	414	+3.30%
2017	463	+2.26%
2023	462	−0.04%
Source: INSEE

== Sights ==
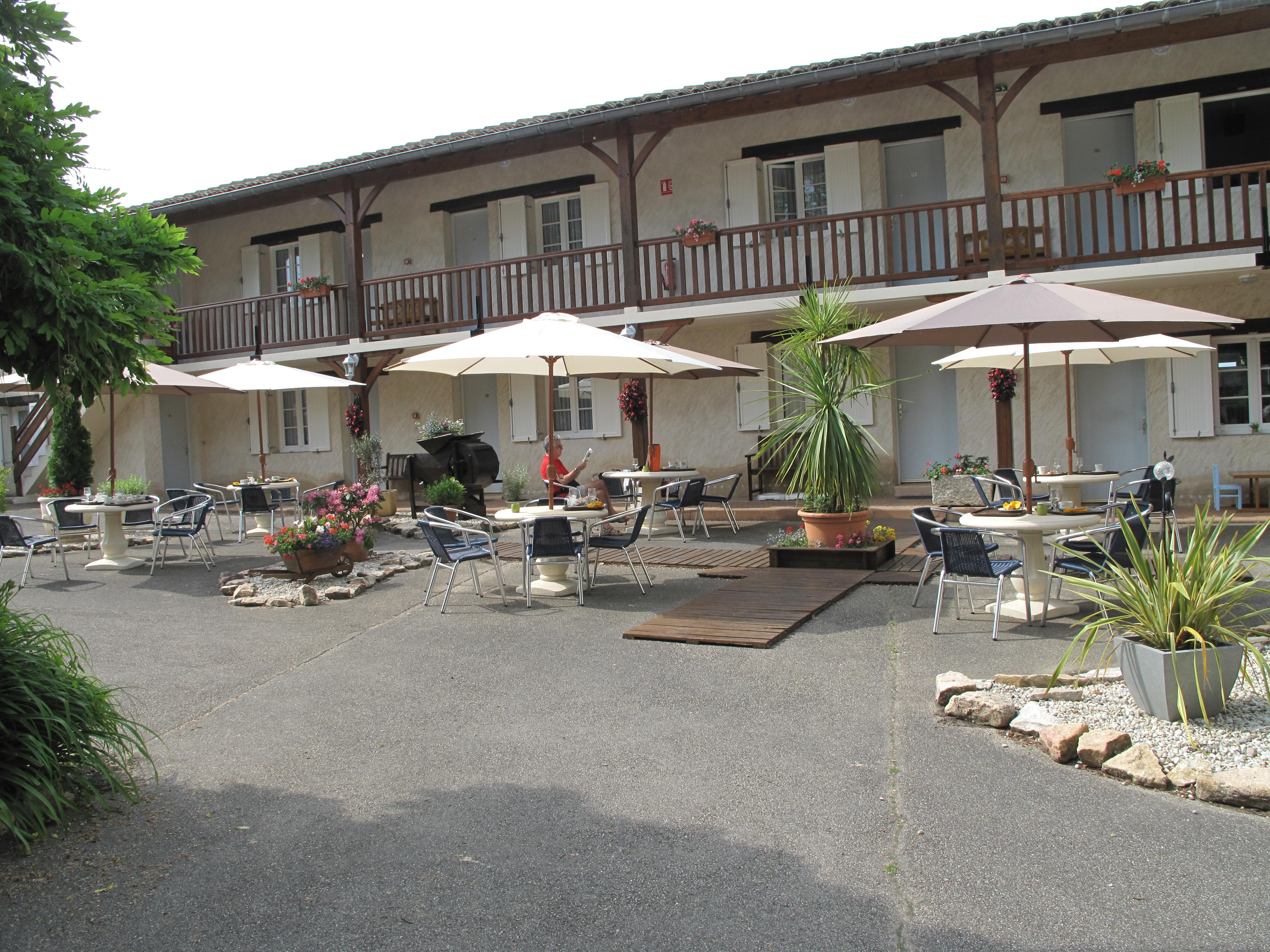
The Moulin de la Brevette Yard

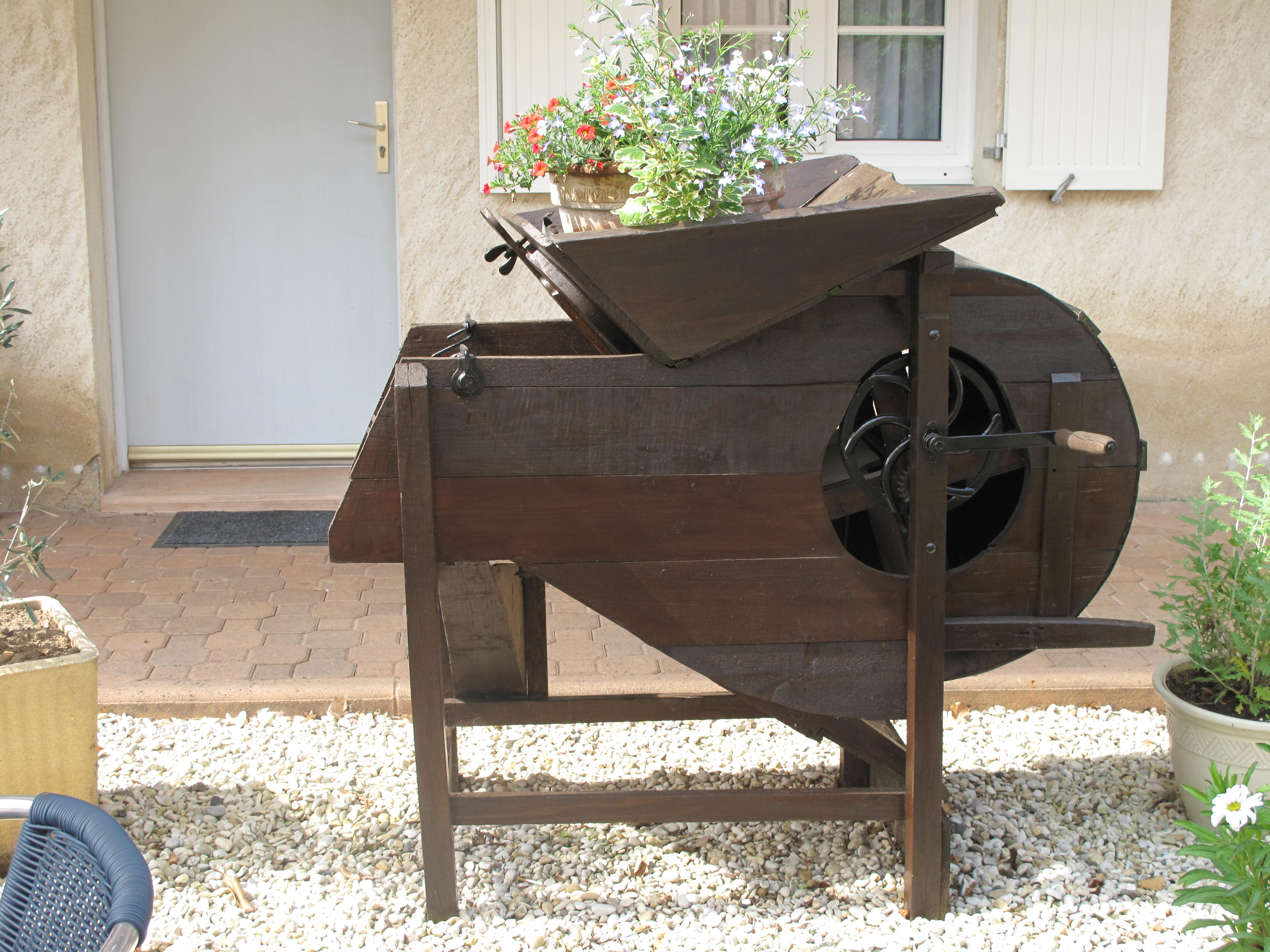
An old winnowing machine at the Moulin de la Brevette

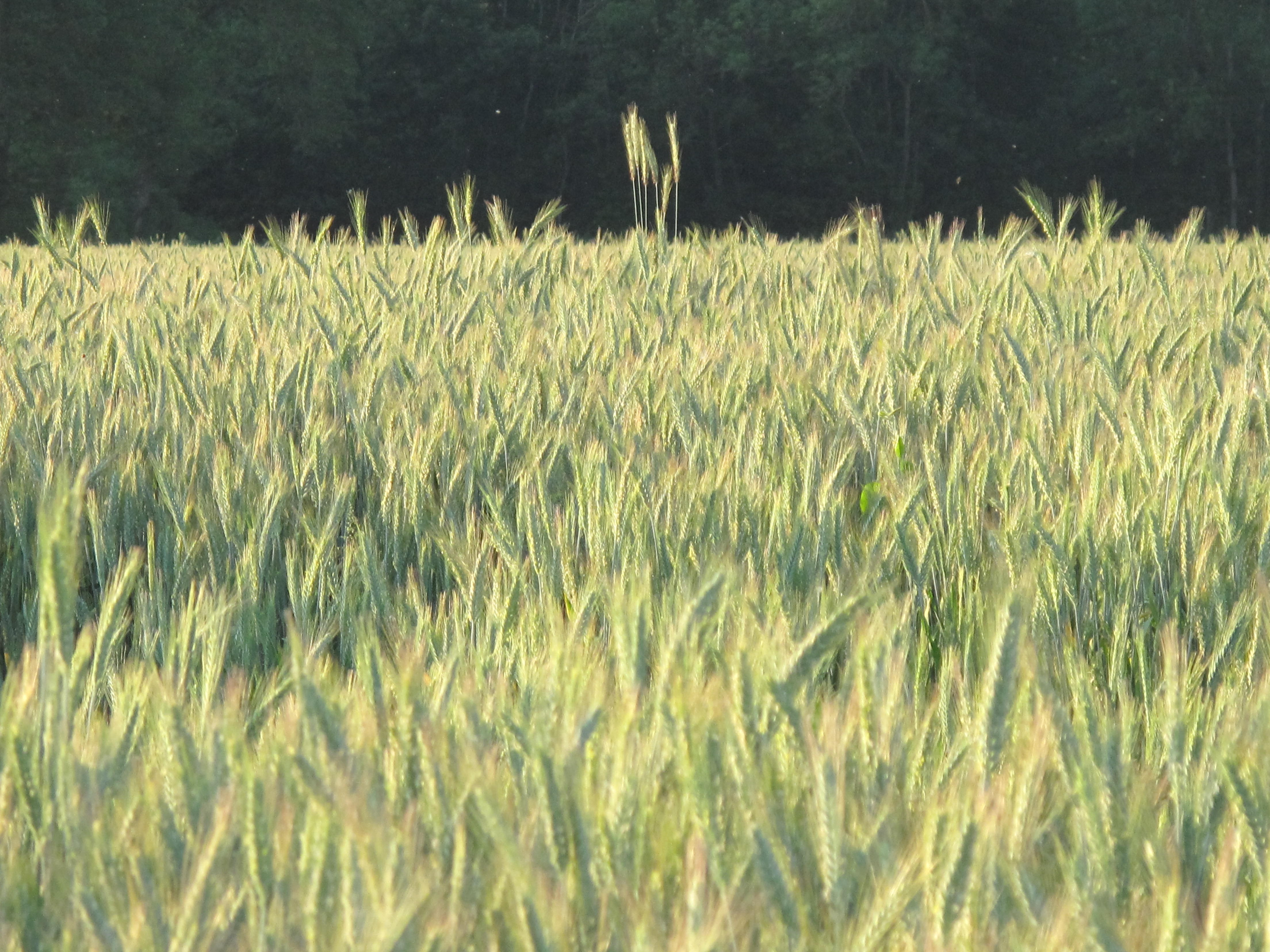
Wheat field in Arbigny

- The remains of an old Fortified Chateau
- A Napoleonic milestone dated 1808
- A Stone marker commemorating the landing fields of the Royal Air Force during the Second World War, on the road to Uchizy just before the bridge over the Saône. The code name of the landing field was "JUNOT".
- A Plaque honouring two young resistance fighters (Dupasquier and Clairmidi) murdered by the Nazis in 1944 at a place called "La Varenne".

=== Protected natural areas ===
The floodplains of the Saône valley have been classified as protected areas since 1994.

== See also ==
- Communes of the Ain department
- Chizerots
