= Ozan, Ain =

Commune in Auvergne-Rhône-Alpes, France

Ozan
- Commune
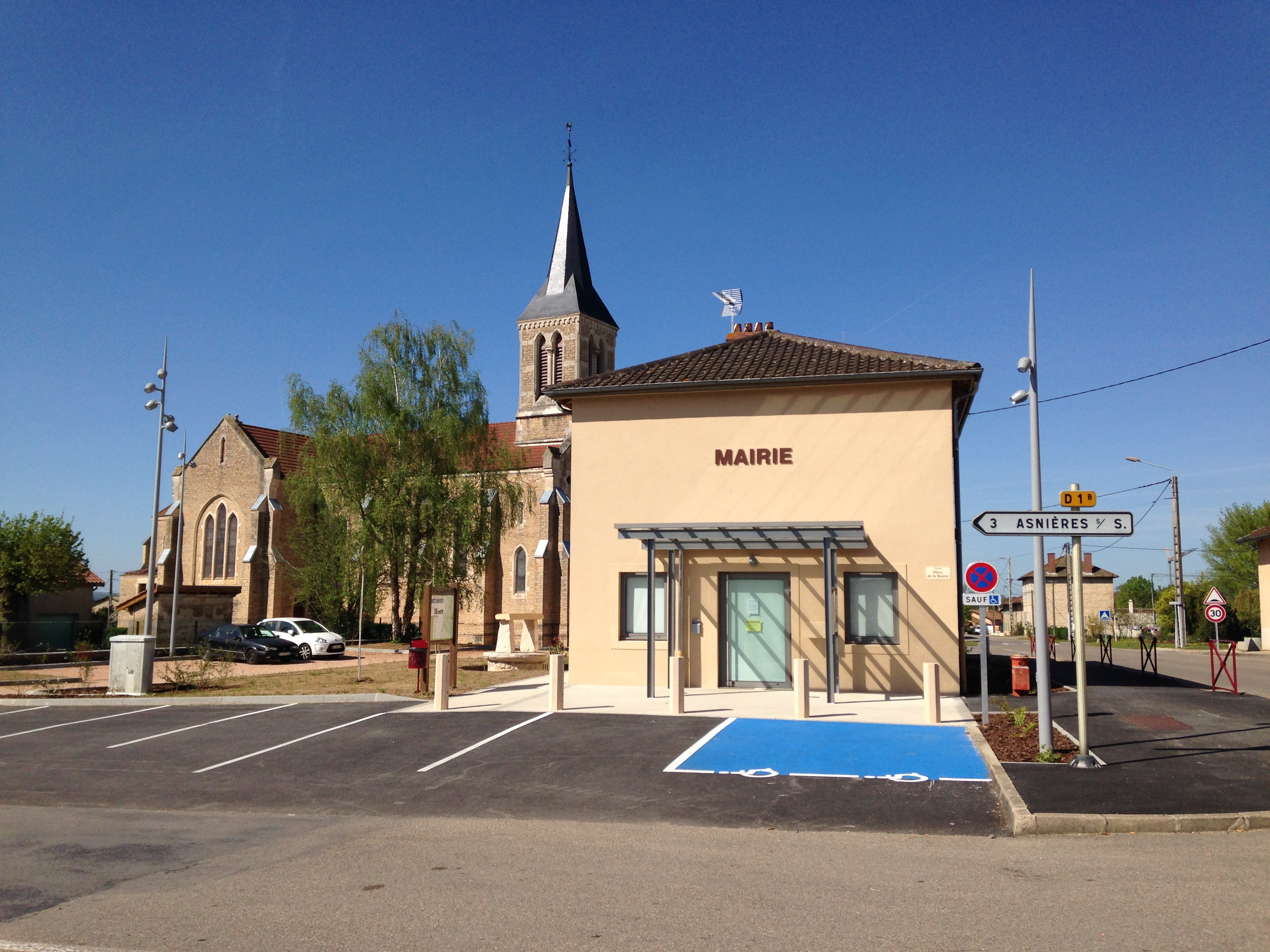
- Town hall

- Coat of arms
- Location of Ozan
- Location within France Location within Auvergne-Rhône-Alpes
- Coordinates: 46°23′33″N 4°54′58″E
- Country: France
- Region: Auvergne-Rhône-Alpes
- Department: Ain
- Arrondissement: Bourg-en-Bresse
- Canton: Replonges

Government
  - Mayor (2026–32): Gilles Catherin
- Area^{1}: 6.6 km^{2} (2.5 sq mi)
- Elevation: 202 m (663 ft)
- Highest elevation: 205 m (673 ft)
- Lowest elevation: 170 m (560 ft)
- Population (2023): 732
  - Density: 110/km^{2} (290/sq mi)
- Time zone: UTC+01:00 (CET)
  - Summer (DST): UTC+02:00 (CEST)
- INSEE/Postal code: 01284 /01190
- ^{1} French Land Register data, which excludes lakes, ponds, glaciers > 1 km^{2} (0.386 sq mi or 247 acres) and river estuaries.

Ozan (French pronunciation: [ozɑ̃]) is a commune in the Ain department in eastern France.

== Population ==
Historical population
Year	Pop.	±% p.a.
1968	328	—
1975	308	−0.89%
1982	339	+1.38%
1990	408	+2.34%
1999	467	+1.51%
2007	509	+1.08%
2012	643	+4.78%
2017	686	+1.30%
2023	732	+1.09%
Source: INSEE

== See also ==
- Communes of the Ain department
- Chizerots
