= Chizerots =

The Chizerots are a historic group of people living in a small locality in Burgundy, France, who are somewhat different in appearance and customs to their neighbours. Their origins are uncertain.

North of Mâcon and south of Tournus, on both banks of the Saône, there are, on one side, the villages of Boz, Ozan, Arbigny and Sermoyer, whose inhabitants call themselves Burkins, and on the other side, the village of Uchizy, whose inhabitants go by the name of Chizerots. In contradiction to M. Reboud, M. Reinaud seems to doubt their Saracen origin: "In 1862 I went to Uchizy and Arbigny; several persons there told me themselves that they were of Arabian or Saracenic origin. In the midst of numerous individuals, having apparently no very distinct anthropological characters, some very black haired women differed from the inhabitants of the neighbourhood by their tall and slender figure; their elongated faces, without malar prominences, by their uniform and dark complexion, by their large eyes, long eyelashes, black, thick and arched eye- brows, by their physiognomy, melancholy, yet regular and beautiful; for one of these young Chizerotes, when the French empress passed through Macon, had been appointed, as the most beautiful girl of the whole district, to offer a bouquet to her sovereign. That type seems more Arabian than Berberic."

"On the border between the mediæval dukedom and the principality of Dombes, to-day the Départements of the Saône et Loire and the Ain, is a race apart from other mankind hereabouts. In numerous little villages, notably at Boz and Huchisi (Uchizy), one may still observe the dark Saracen features of the ancients mingled with those of to-day. A monograph has recently appeared which defines these peoples as something quite unlike the other varied races now welded into the citizens of twentieth century France. Modern vogue, style, fashion, or whatever you may choose to call it, is everywhere fast changing the old picturesque costume into something of the ready-made, big-store order, but to stroll about the highways and byways in these parts and see men in baggy Turkish trousers with their coats and waistcoats tied together by strings or ribbons in place of conventional buttons, is as a whiff of the Orient, or at least a reminder of the long ago. The women dress in a distinct, but perhaps not otherwise very remarkable, manner, save that an occasional 'Turk's-Head' turban is seen, quite as Oriental as the culotte of the men. A blend of Spain, of Arabia, of Persia and of Turkey could not present a costume more droll than that of the 'Chizerots,' as these people are known."

"The Burhin and Chizerot tribes on either bank of the Saône in Burgundy were thought to be Saracen because they were short and dark, and because they treated illnesses with a special form of 'oriental' massage. (Reports that they wore turbans and Turkish trousers and swore by Allah are not entirely reliable)."
