= Boz, Ain =

Commune in Auvergne-Rhône-Alpes, France

Boz
- Commune
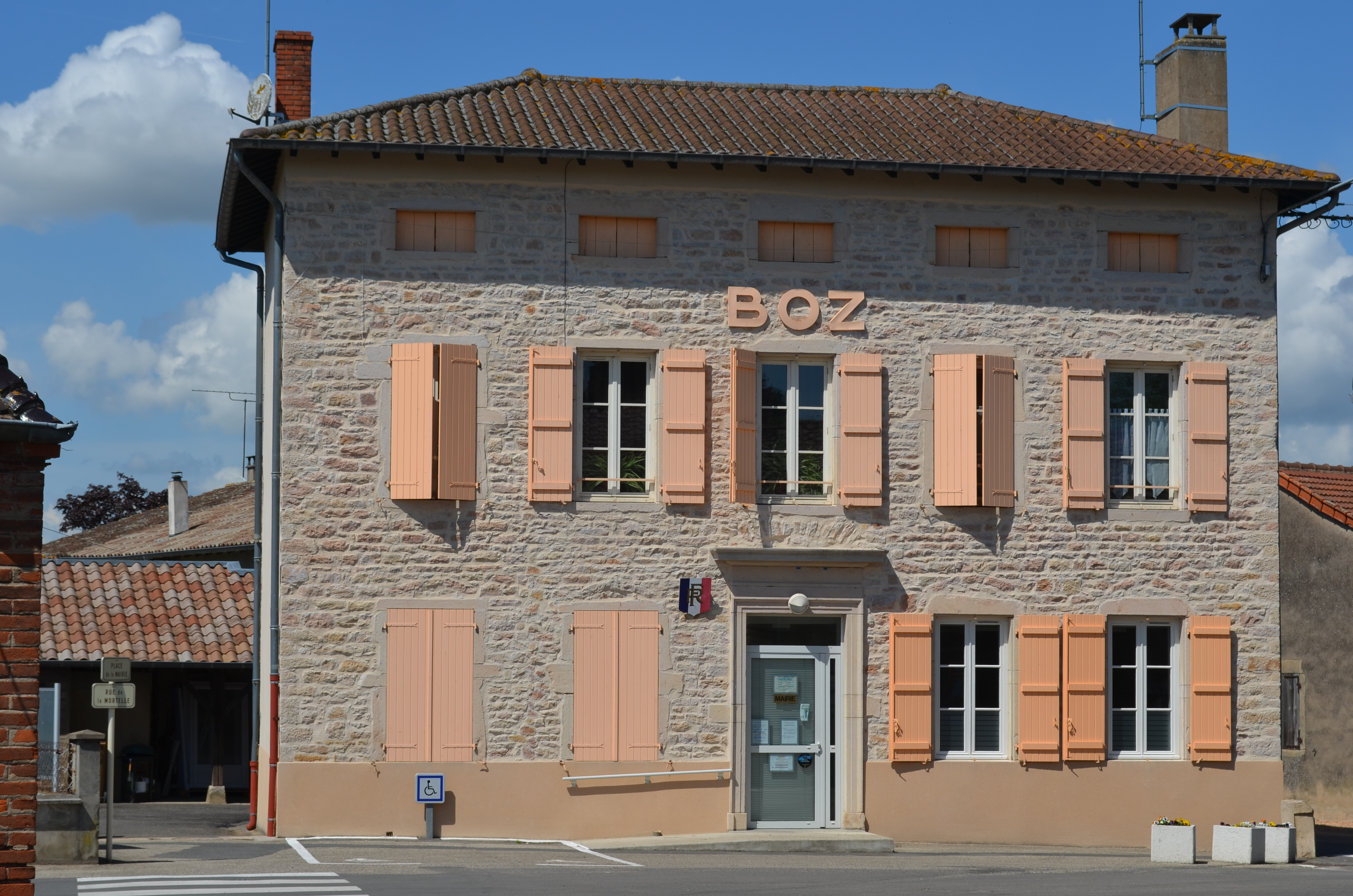
- Town hall
- Location of Boz
- Location within France Location within Auvergne-Rhône-Alpes
- Coordinates: 46°24′28″N 4°54′37″E
- Country: France
- Region: Auvergne-Rhône-Alpes
- Department: Ain
- Arrondissement: Bourg-en-Bresse
- Canton: Replonges
- Intercommunality: Bresse et Saône

Government
  - Mayor (2026–32): Monique Joubert-Laurencin
- Area^{1}: 7.31 km^{2} (2.82 sq mi)
- Elevation: 180 m (590 ft)
- Highest elevation: 206 m (676 ft)
- Lowest elevation: 168 m (551 ft)
- Population (2023): 513
  - Density: 70.2/km^{2} (182/sq mi)
- Time zone: UTC+01:00 (CET)
  - Summer (DST): UTC+02:00 (CEST)
- INSEE/Postal code: 01057 /01190
- Website: https://communeboz.fr/
- ^{1} French Land Register data, which excludes lakes, ponds, glaciers > 1 km^{2} (0.386 sq mi or 247 acres) and river estuaries.

Boz is a commune in the Ain department in eastern France.

== Population ==
Historical population
| Year | Pop. | ±% p.a. |
|---|---|---|
| 1968 | 335 | — |
| 1975 | 348 | +0.55% |
| 1982 | 323 | −1.06% |
| 1990 | 352 | +1.08% |
| 1999 | 359 | +0.22% |
| 2007 | 491 | +3.99% |
| 2012 | 495 | +0.16% |
| 2017 | 512 | +0.68% |
| 2023 | 513 | +0.03% |
Source: INSEE

== See also ==
- Communes of the Ain department
- Chizerots
