= Sermoyer =

Commune in Auvergne-Rhône-Alpes, France

- Commune
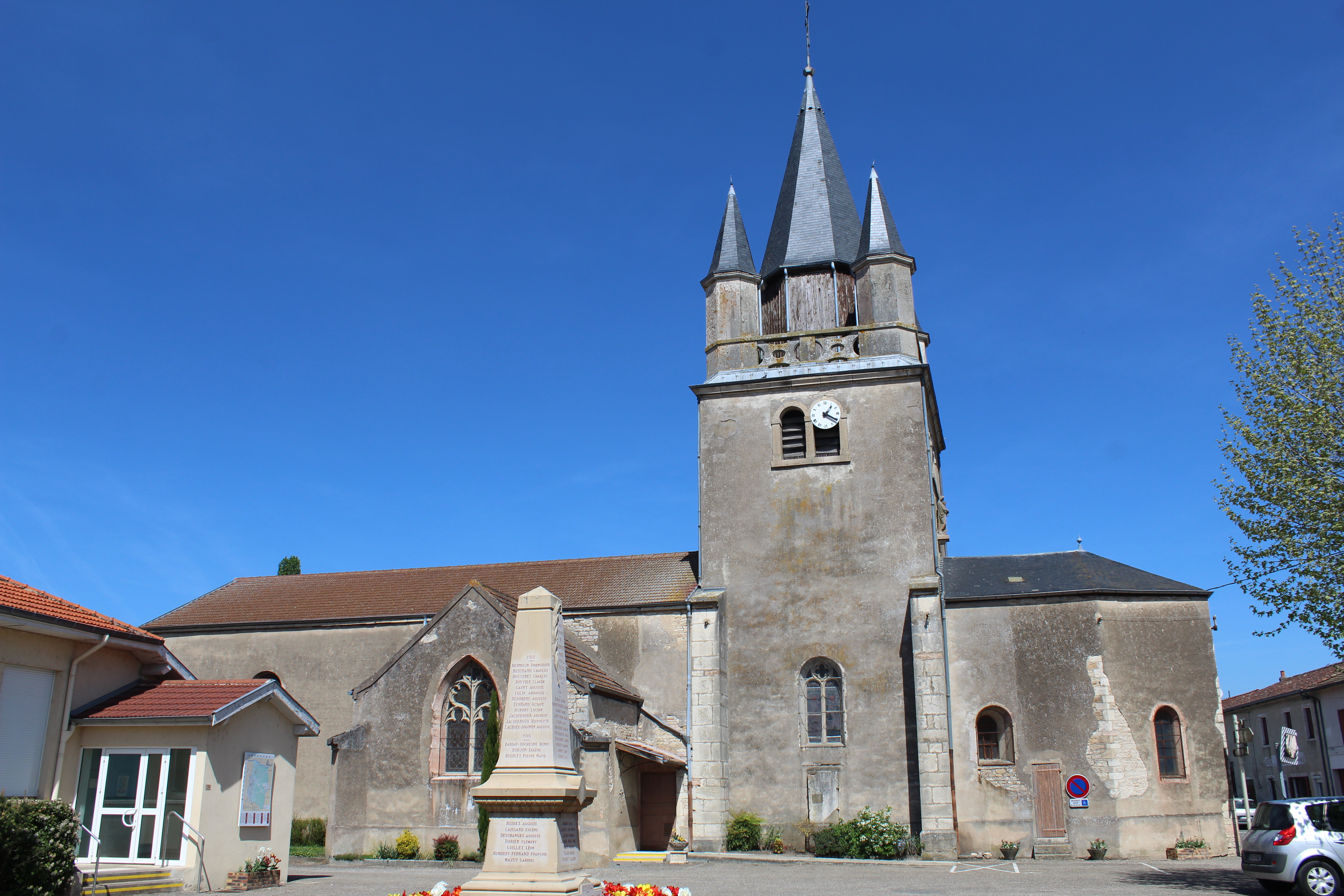
- Location of Sermoyer
- Location within France Location within Auvergne-Rhône-Alpes
- Coordinates: 46°30′01″N 4°58′53″E
- Country: France
- Region: Auvergne-Rhône-Alpes
- Department: Ain
- Arrondissement: Bourg-en-Bresse
- Canton: Replonges

Government
  - Mayor (2026–32): Huguette Panchot
- Area^{1}: 16.7 km^{2} (6.4 sq mi)
- Elevation: 200 m (660 ft)
- Highest elevation: 214 m (702 ft)
- Lowest elevation: 168 m (551 ft)
- Population (2023): 670
  - Density: 40/km^{2} (100/sq mi)
- Time zone: UTC+01:00 (CET)
  - Summer (DST): UTC+02:00 (CEST)
- INSEE/Postal code: 01402 /01190
- ^{1} French Land Register data, which excludes lakes, ponds, glaciers > 1 km^{2} (0.386 sq mi or 247 acres) and river estuaries.

Sermoyer (French pronunciation: [sɛʁmwaje]) is a commune in the Ain department in eastern France.

== Population ==
Historical population
Year	Pop.	±% p.a.
1968	526	—
1975	458	−1.96%
1982	515	+1.69%
1990	522	+0.17%
1999	545	+0.48%
2007	651	+2.25%
2012	675	+0.73%
2017	668	−0.21%
2023	670	+0.05%
Source: INSEE

== See also ==
- Communes of the Ain department
- Chizerots
