= Uchizy =

- Commune
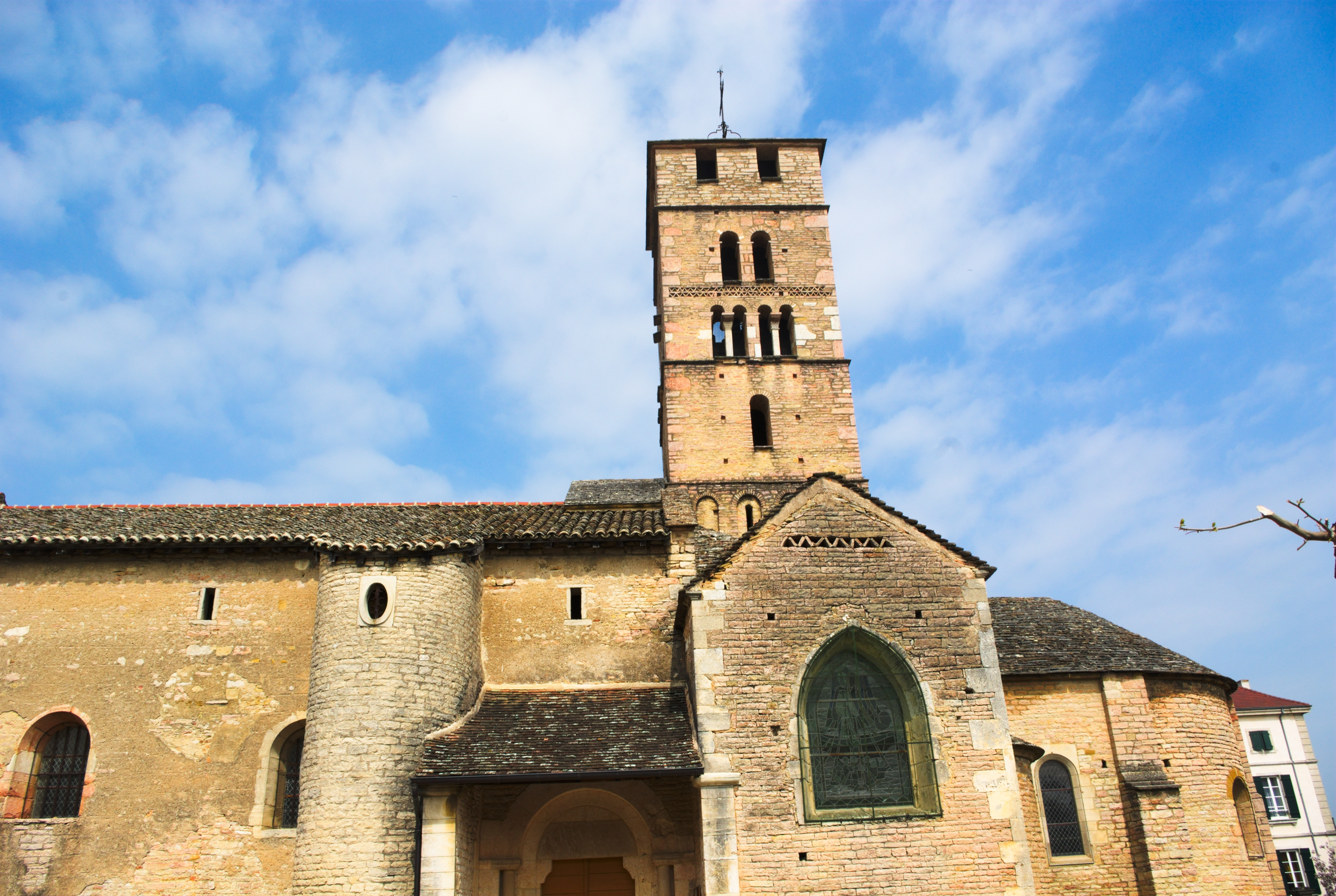
- The church in Uchizy

- Coat of arms
- Location of Uchizy
- Location within France Location within Bourgogne-Franche-Comté
- Coordinates: 46°30′16″N 4°53′11″E
- Country: France
- Region: Bourgogne-Franche-Comté
- Department: Saône-et-Loire
- Arrondissement: Mâcon
- Canton: Tournus
- Intercommunality: Mâconnais-Tournugeois

Government
  - Mayor (2020–2026): Arnaud Maire du Poset
- Area^{1}: 12.49 km^{2} (4.82 sq mi)
- Elevation: 240 m (790 ft)
- Highest elevation: 325 m (1,066 ft)
- Lowest elevation: 169 m (554 ft)
- Population (2023): 831
  - Density: 66.5/km^{2} (172/sq mi)
- Time zone: UTC+01:00 (CET)
  - Summer (DST): UTC+02:00 (CEST)
- INSEE/Postal code: 71550 /71700
- ^{1} French Land Register data, which excludes lakes, ponds, glaciers > 1 km^{2} (0.386 sq mi or 247 acres) and river estuaries.

Uchizy (French pronunciation: [yʃizi]) is a commune in the Saône-et-Loire department in the region of Bourgogne-Franche-Comté in eastern France.

== Population ==
Historical population
Year	Pop.	±% p.a.
1968	650	—
1975	612	−0.86%
1982	642	+0.69%
1990	623	−0.37%
1999	729	+1.76%
2007	786	+0.95%
2012	828	+1.05%
2017	843	+0.36%
2023	831	−0.24%
Source: INSEE

== See also ==
- Communes of the Saône-et-Loire department
- Chizerots
