= Maquis de l'Ain et du Haut-Jura =

French resistance groups in Ain and Haut-Jura during World War II

Maquis of Ain and Haut-Jura
- Part of World War II
Date	January 1943 – mid-September 1944
Location	Bugey and Haut-Jura
Result	Withdrawal of German troops

Belligerents
(Free France) Maquisards, then (Free France) FFI	(Nazi Germany) (Vichy France) French State: Milice; GMR

Commanders and leaders
Henri Romans-Petit	Karl Pflaum

Strength
485 men (Note: Maquisard strength at the end of 1943, last figure from the maquis strength ledger.) (end of 1943) 7,206 men (Note: p. 212.) (June 1944)	Germany : 8,600 to 10,500 men (Note: p. 249.) GMR : 1,500 men

Casualties and losses
FFI : 320 killed 145 wounded 6 missing maquisards : 60 killed (Note: p. 257.) (Note: The figures of 60 maquisards dead and 300 German soldiers dead are an estimate by Denis Johnson in mid-July 1944.)	~ 300 killed

The maquis of Ain and Haut-Jura are groups of French resistance fighters and foreigners who operated and found refuge in the mountains and forests of Bugey and Haut-Jura during World War II.

These groups began to form as early as the beginning of 1943, when unpopularity towards the Vichy regime increased due to the forced requisition of workers for the compulsory work service. The organization in the form of camps is the work of Henri Romans-Petit who distributed these people in different isolated farms on the reliefs of Haut-Bugey. A military organization is set up, notably thanks to the creation of a cadre school in Montgriffon, in June 1943.

Several notable actions are carried out during the history of the maquis. The first large-scale ones are the seizures of the supply depots of the Youth Work Camps in Artemare then the Army supply in Bourg-en-Bresse in September 1943. The landmark event of the maquis of Ain and Haut-Jura is the organization of a parade on 11 November 1943 in Oyonnax by a troop of about two hundred maquisards, on the day marking the anniversary of the Armistice of 1918. The event is reported in the clandestine press as well as on London radio, offering the Resistance a concrete existence in the eyes of the French population and the Allies.

Considered terrorists, these groups are the target of strong repression. Initially, the objective of destroying the maquis is entrusted to Vichy forces: punctual and targeted operations take place regularly. In a second phase, from the end of 1943, faced with the growing power of the maquis, the Wehrmacht attempts to annihilate the maquisard camps. Several operations are carried out by the Germans in February, April and July 1944. Despite human and material losses, the resistance holds and sabotage takes place on road and rail communication axes to slow down the advance of German convoys. The department of Ain is liberated in September 1944, putting an end to the armed struggle of the department's maquisards.

== History ==
=== Creation ===
==== Beginnings of resistance in Ain ====
The demarcation line during the occupation.

The occupation of France by Nazi Germany during World War II led to the division of French territory into two parts subject to different legislations. Between June 1940 and November 1942, the department of Ain was included in the free zone under the Vichy regime, except for Pays de Gex which was part of the forbidden zone. Laws were put in place as early as 4 October 1940 to place "foreigners of Jewish race" in French internment camps. As persecutions intensified towards the end of 1942, part of the population decided to assist the victims of these persecutions and formed the first groups of civil resistance.

As early as 1941, students from Lycée Lalande in Bourg-en-Bresse united to try to oppose the Vichy regime. In October, they formed a group of six people whose actions were the distribution of leaflets and clandestine newspapers. Other students joined the organization, which would count up to thirty members by the end of the year. The movement expanded thanks to boarders who created groups in their home communes of Pont-de-Vaux, Nantua, Bellegarde-sur-Valserine, Oyonnax and Belley. The group acquired the name "Forces unies de la jeunesse" in November 1942.

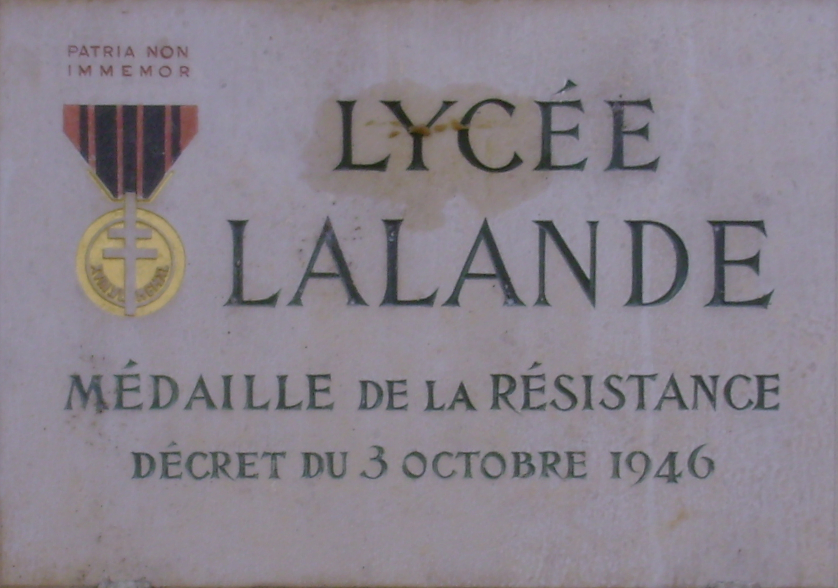
Plaque commemorating the Resistance Medal awarded to Lycée Lalande.

At the same time, the occupier set up the Relève, the purpose of which was to send French workers to Germany to participate in the Reich's war effort, in exchange for the promise of releasing prisoners of war. This workforce consisted of volunteers, who were promised good wages and good food. From the end of 1943, this voluntary participation was replaced by a "compulsory work service", commonly abbreviated STO. To escape it, many refractories decided to hide.

At the end of 1941, Henri Petit was engaged in the Espoir network in Saint-Étienne. During the Christmas holiday, an independent resistant, Marcel Démia, a market gardener-horticulturist from the commune of Ambérieu-en-Bugey, went there to visit his parents. The two men met and exchanged their views on the situation. Their common commitment led Henri Petit to discover the organization of the Resistance in the department of Ain. Marcel Demia told him about the young refractories he had placed in isolated farms and the difficulties he encountered in his organization. Henri Petit arrived in Ain at the end of 1942 and began to help STO refractories find refuge with local inhabitants. He also encouraged them to find work.

==== Establishment of camps ====
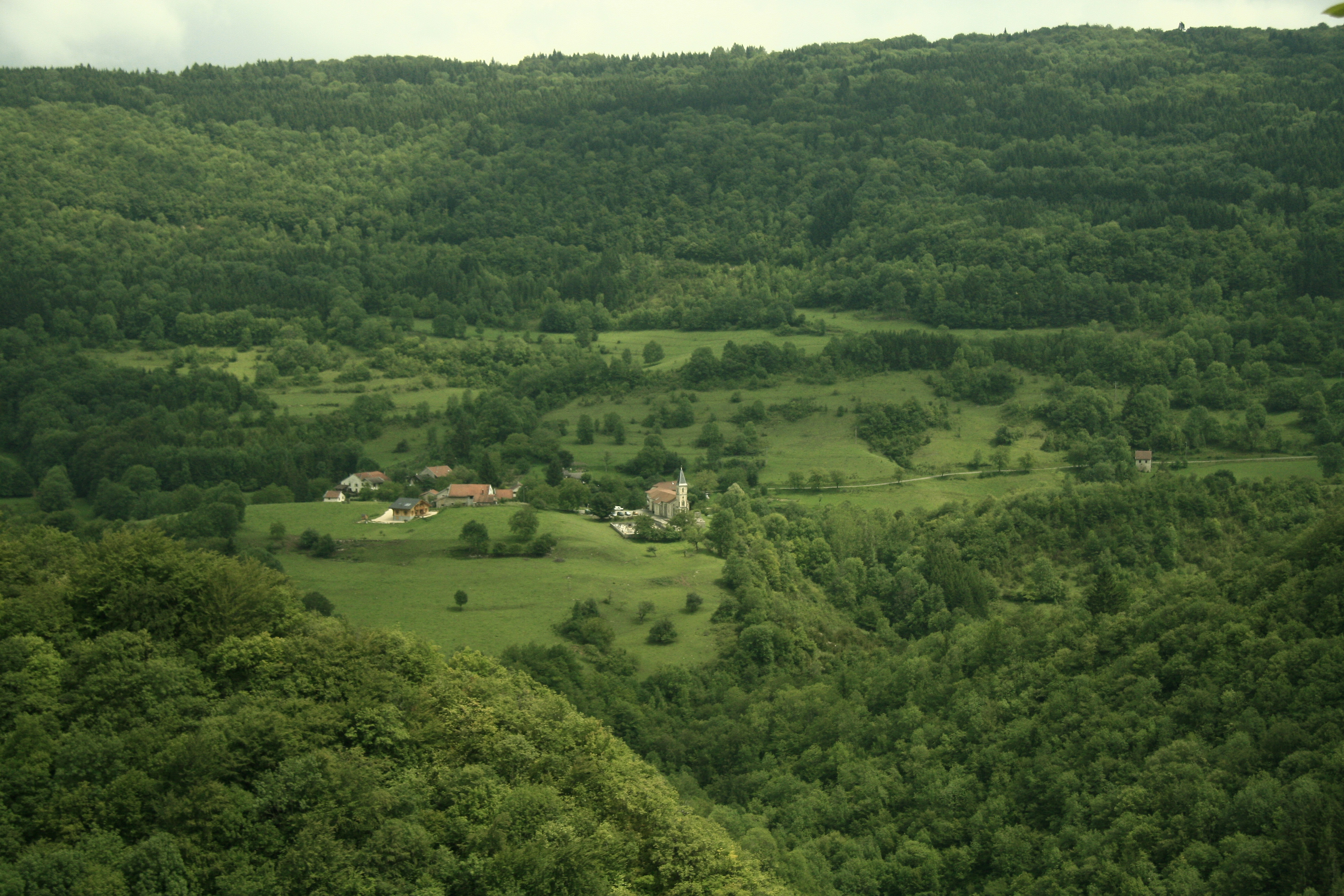
At Les Pézières, the road to Malaval, Colognat and the farms of Les Gorges.

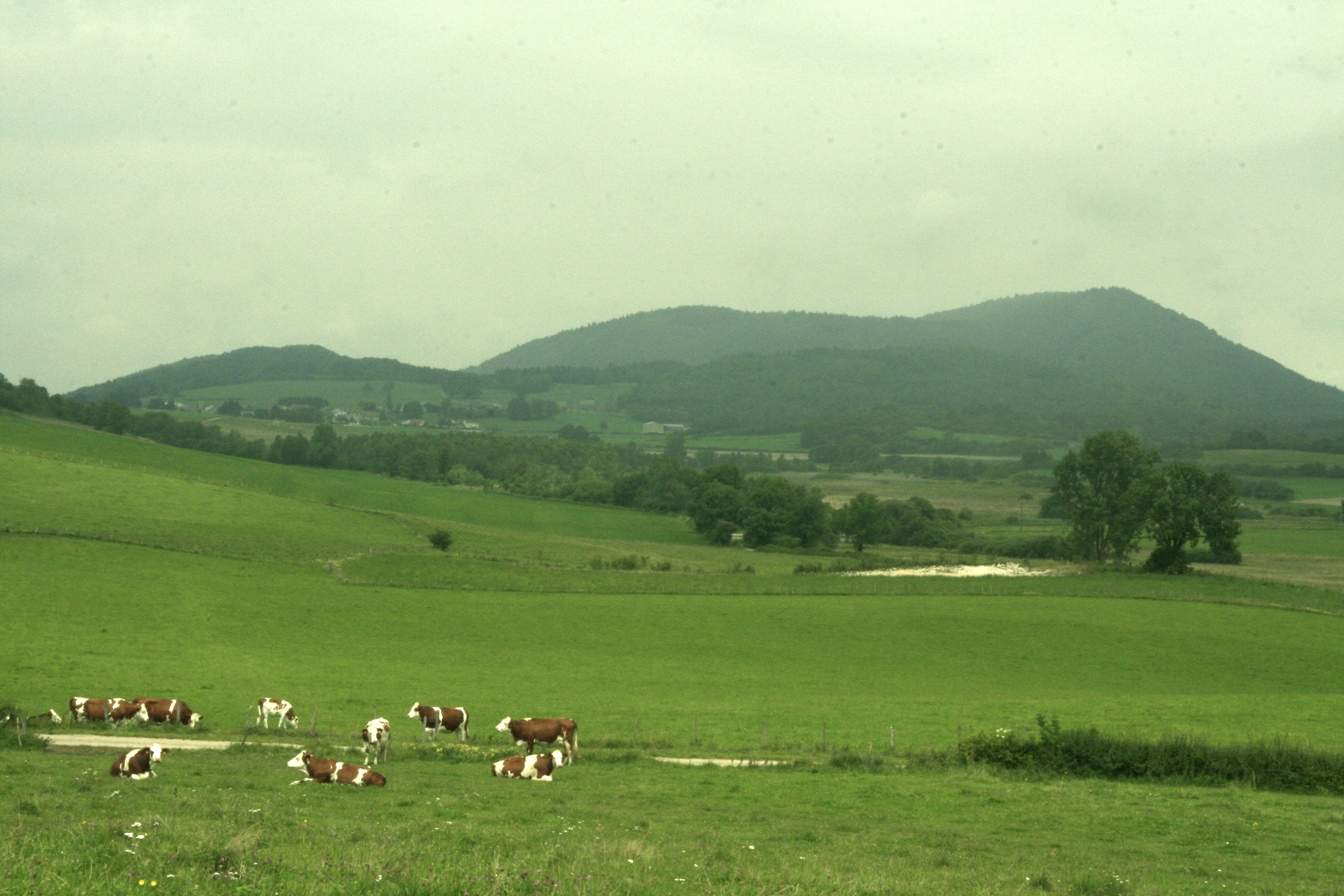
The Mont de l'Avocat seen from Aranc.

At the end of 1942, STO refractories were hidden in groups of two or three around the villages of Aranc, Montgriffon and Corlier. In Montgriffon, in January 1943, the number of refractories increased in the farm of Les Gorges to about twenty members. This abandoned and isolated farm was located at the bottom of a ravine, in the immediate vicinity of a large sloping meadow and a stream. The nearest hamlet was that of Résinand. The framework and military instruction organization set up in this camp, although less populated than other refuge camps, made it the first maquis camp.

To organize this first maquis camp in the department of Ain and manage the arrival of new refractories, the departmental leaders of the Secret Army sought a military leader through René Greusard. None of the demobilized officers from the various regiments in the department or local Secret Army leaders came forward to carry out this mission. The regional directorate of the Mouvements unis de la Résistance was called upon and a meeting held in 1943 at the Le Café français in Bourg-en-Bresse confirmed Henri Romans-Petit as leader of the maquis of Ain and Haut-Jura.

In May 1943, on Mont de l'Avocat near the commune of Izenave, Pierre Marcault gathered STO refractories and a few volunteers from the communes of Villereversure and Bourg-en-Bresse. The shelters were rudimentary and consisted of a few corrugated iron sheets recovered near regional agricultural operations as well as branches. This camp was nicknamed "Bir-Hakeim" and also became the refuge for four Spanish Republicans working on a farm. Supplies were provided by peasants from Izenave and the "Turc brothers" living in the commune of Corlier.

On the night of 9 to 10 June 1943, at the granges of Faysse between Aranc and Boyeux-Saint-Jérôme, Henri Romans-Petit organized the first meeting with the twenty people gathered on Mont de l'Avocat, with the aim of organizing the maquis. This place was designated to be the depot for clothing and supplies. Fearing discouragement on their part, he placed them in the farm of Les Gorges, following the advice of Marius Chavant, deputy mayor of the commune of Montgriffon. The latter had the advantage of being a geographical location favorable to the implementation of attack strategies. Lacking financial means to buy food, he let the others who had work stay with farmers or artisans while remaining in contact with them.

=== Development ===
==== Training ====
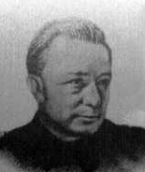
Portrait of Henri Romans-Petit.

In April 1943, Henri Romans-Petit created a cadre school at the farm of Les Gorges near Montgriffon. It was the first structure in the region intended to train maquisards. It was run by Pierre Marcault and aimed to train the various maquis leaders. Henri Romans-Petit's wish was to recruit officers and non-commissioned officers from the demobilized Armistice Army to frame the camps. Applications were rare, as maquisards had a reputation as terrorists.

On 14 July 1943, many resistants gathered at the Terment farm to celebrate the national holiday despite the prohibition by the Vichy regime. The first maquis groups were thus formed and the graduates of the cadre school distributed in different camps in Granges, Cize, Chougeat, Corlier and Plateau de Retord. These were Pierre Marcault, Jean Vaudan, then, later, in August 1943, Lieutenant Henri Girousse and Aspirant Noël Perrotot who were active officers. The cadre school closed at the end of July 1943, but Pierre Marcault continued instruction at the Morez camp of which he was in charge.

Geographical organization of the French Resistance.

Henri Romans-Petit quickly became the leader of the maquis organization and organized the different camps by limiting the number of occupants to sixty men. The regional deputy chief of the Secret Army, Albert Chambonnet, as well as the president of the departmental directorate of the United Movements of the Resistance, René Greusard decided, during a meeting at the Buffet de la gare in Bourg-en-Bresse in August 1943, to confirm Henri Romans-Petit as leader of the maquis of Ain. He was tasked with placing under his authority the refractory camps that had formed spontaneously in the department.

In September 1943, to manage the flow of new arrivals and try to unmask possible infiltrators, new recruits were received at the Mont camp near Nantua, a so-called sorting center placed under the authority of Gabriel Even. From its creation, all maquis candidates passed through the sorting center. The objectives were to prevent the infiltration of militiamen into the maquis camps and to retain only men whose physical and mental capacities were sufficient. After validation of physical tests and interrogations, the selected men were directed to the various camps in the department.

The cadres distributed their tasks to the instruction of the young, which lasted a month and was to allow them to adapt to maquis life, but also to camp guard.

==== First actions ====
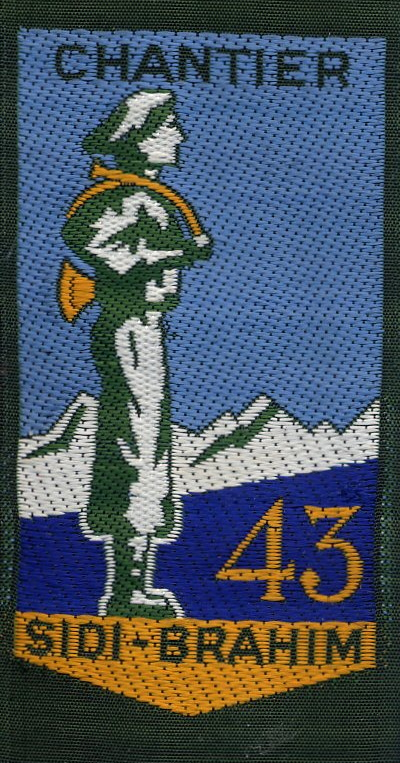
Insignia of the CJF of Artemare.

The first maquis groups were very poorly armed. Part of the armament came from the Résistance-Fer movement which received from the British army as early as 26 October 1942, stocks of explosives and weapons. The group needing only explosives to carry out their actions, the weapons were made available to the resistants of Ain, The first parachute drops of supplies and weapons intended for the maquis arrived from the beginning of 1943.

The first actions of the maquisards consisted of aid provided in particular to local populations or to resistants, a few armed engagements but also various sabotages against the Nazi occupier. These actions allowed recognition by the populations and an increase in recruitment. Henri Romans-Petit and his cadres set up a precise schedule where roles were clearly defined. In addition to guard duty and military instruction, daily physical exercises kept the men alert.

The railway stake was already known at the beginning of 1943. The first attacks against railway lines took place in spring 1943, they would multiply thereafter.

The first large-scale action carried out under the direction of Henri Romans-Petit was the seizure of the supply depot of the Youth Work Camps in Artemare on the night of 10 September 1943. The commando, after meticulous preparation and in a few minutes, took the uniforms that the maquisards would use during the 11 November 1943 parade. Eighteen days later, the maquisards attacked the Army supply in Bourg-en-Bresse. The operation was prepared by Henri Girousse, who had the idea of letting himself be locked in the warehouse one evening. He noted the location of the supplies to allow a quick maneuver the next day. On the evening of the operation, the ten tons of supplies were loaded in less than twenty minutes into the trucks.

=== Terrorism accusations ===
==== Interventions of the GMR and the French Militia ====
From the summer of 1943, operations aimed at searching for refractories to the STO were carried out. The first was planned for 28 June 1943 on the Retord Plateau. The gendarmerie brigade of Nantua joined the departmental service of the Direction centrale des renseignements généraux of Ain and 72 mobile reserve guards (GMR). The gendarmes of Brénod were designated to serve as guides for the GMR. But there was complicity between most of the gendarmes of the commune and the maquisards installed on the plateau. A strategy was put in place to avoid confrontation. The gendarmes guided the GMR to the Gros-Turc farm which had been occupied by the maquis three months earlier. A fire was lit there to make believe that the premises were occupied, and during the approach of the gendarmes, a group was to fire in the air and cause the flight of the GMR thinking they were outnumbered.

No arrests took place that day. One of the General Intelligence inspectors wrote a report stating:

upon our arrival at the operation sites, at two o'clock, as we were getting off the buses, a flare emitting a red glow rose into the sky.

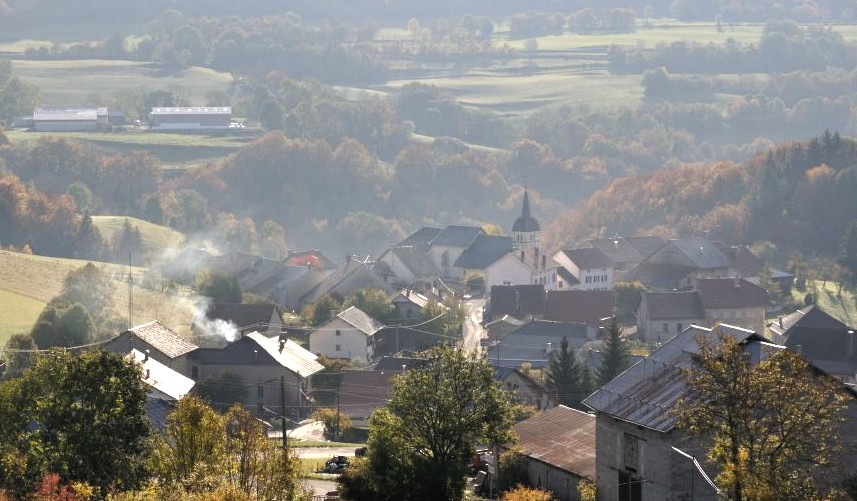
View of Petit-Abergement.

Other operations took place the next day at Col de Richemond, in Brénod, at Petit-Abergement and in the forest of Champdor, but no maquisard was arrested. For their part, the Nazi military carried out an operation on 1 July. It resulted in the arrest of five men, including two armed. The police and GMR successfully carried out a new operation on the Retord Plateau on 11 August 1943.

At the end of the summer, the resistants of Ain multiplied attacks on persons. The targets were black market traffickers, collaborators and members of the Service d'ordre légionnaire. In Bourg-en-Bresse, General Marie-Eugène Debeney was seriously injured by a bomb placed in the car with which he was returning from a ceremony of the Legion of Combatants on 29 August 1943. He died on 6 November 1943.

==== Increase in armament and logistics of the maquis ====
In July 1943, the commander of the 27th Mountain Infantry Brigade, Jean Vallette d'Osia, and his cadres visited the maquis of Ain. He contacted the British legation in Bern, and requested weapons from the Allies for all maquis groups. It was from this request that the first inter-allied maquis mission, named Mission Musc, was prepared for September 1943. The Special Operations Executive decided to send only the minimum weapons and supplies necessary for the maquis. The services could not guarantee the discipline of the men, support was to take place only in case of attack by the GMR or German troops.

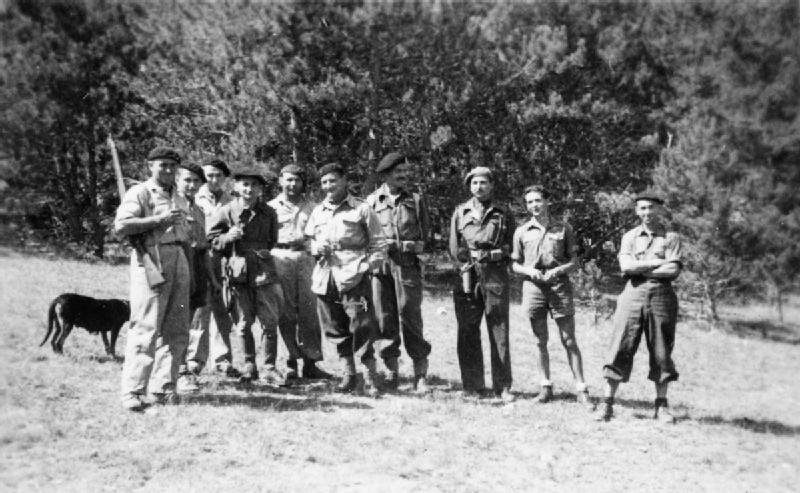
Maquisards in Savoie. The third and fourth from the right are members of the SOE.

The start of the mission took place on the night of 21 to 22 September 1943 on a ground located north of Pont-de-Vaux. A twin-engine Lockheed Hudson dropped Richard Heslop from the Special Operations Executive and Jean Rosenthal from the Bureau central de renseignements et d'action who went to Haute-Savoie and Gérard Michel who went to the Vercors. The mission consisted of inspecting the maquis of Savoie, Haute-Savoie, Isère then those of Ain and Jura. The goal was to assess the discipline of the camps and the number of fighters likely to be equipped and armed. These visits ended with the men's return to England on the night of 16 to 17 October 1943. During the mission, eight camps were visited, including one camp in the department of Ain. A second delegation arrived in Jura, on a ground north of the commune of Bletterans, on the night of 18 to 19 October 1943. It was composed of Jean Rosenthal, Richard Heslop, Elizabeth Devereux-Rochester and Owen Denis Johnson who returned to Ain in January 1944.

Richard Heslop remained in Ain in contact with Henri Romans-Petit and stayed in liaison with the Special Operations Executive for receiving mission orders, funds and weapons.

==== Image repair ====
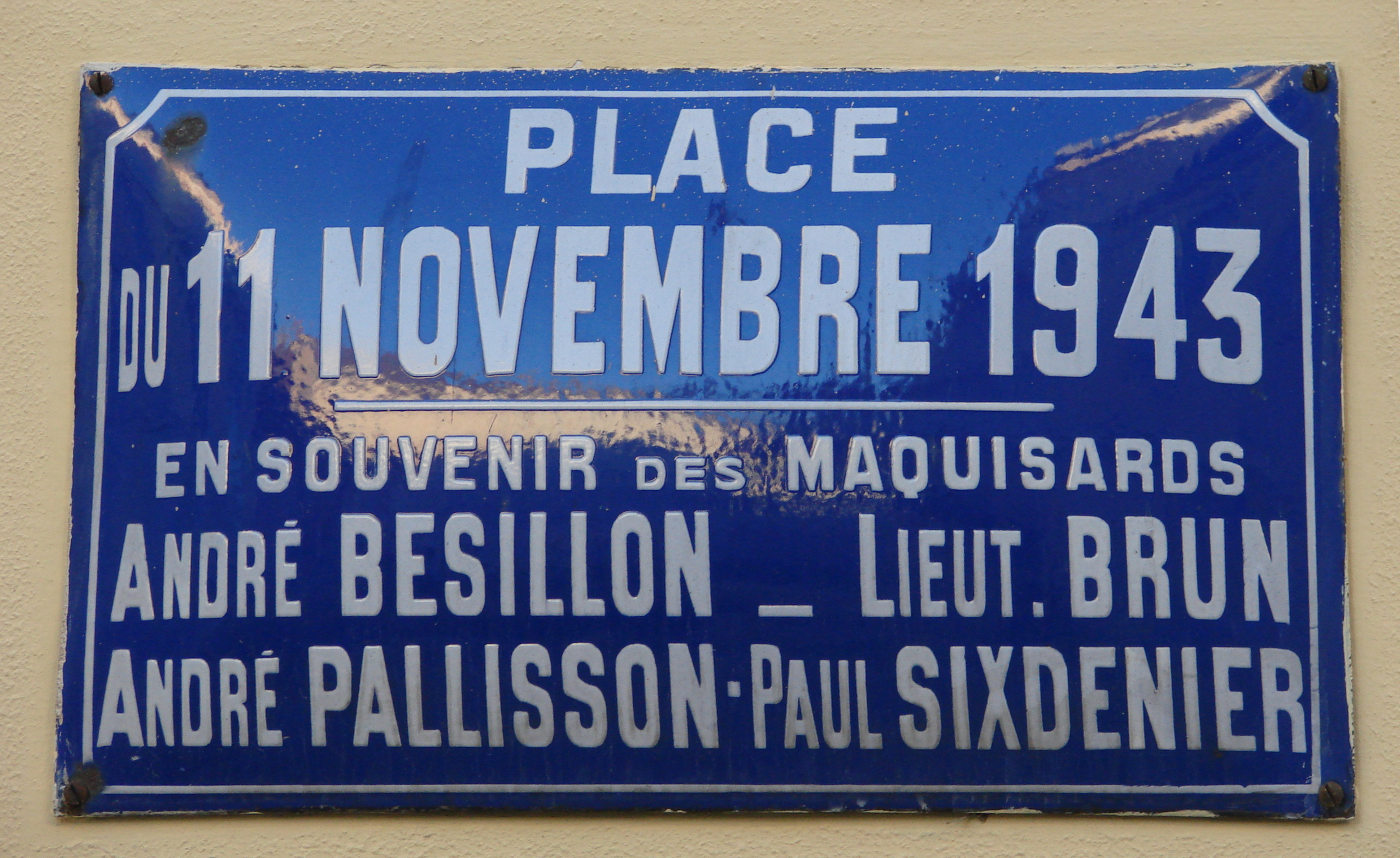
Place du 11 novembre 1943 - Oyonnax.

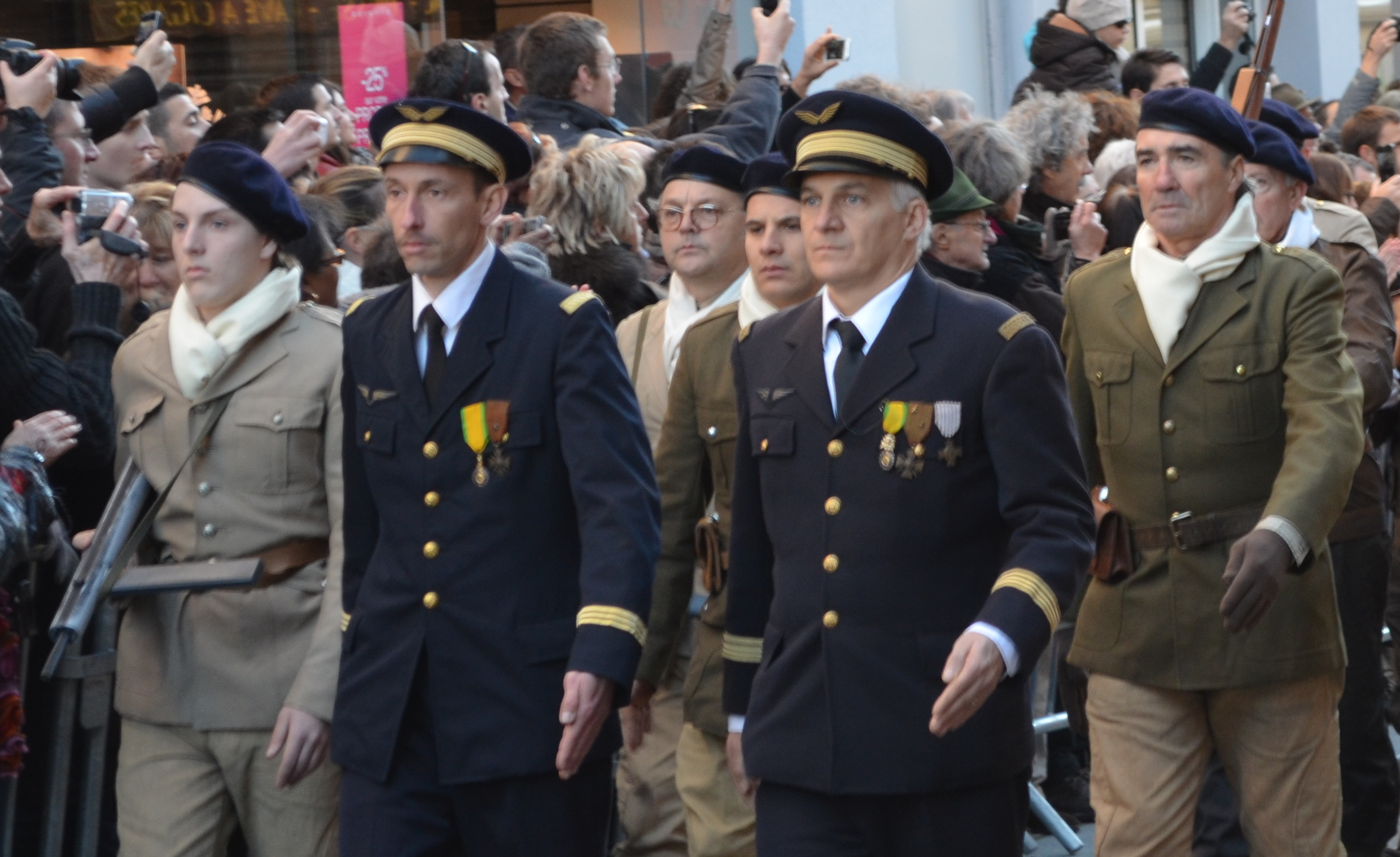
Ceremony of the 70th anniversary of the 11 November 1943 parade in Oyonnax.

Approaching 11 November 1943, the twenty-fifth anniversary of the Armistice of 1918, Henri Romans-Petit decided to organize a spectacular coup: a military parade that would counter the image of terrorists that Marshal Pétain gave to the maquisards. On 11 November 1943, in Oyonnax, about two hundred maquisards from Ain and Haut-Jura paraded to the war memorial to deposit a wreath in the shape of a Cross of Lorraine bearing the inscription: "Les vainqueurs de demain à ceux de 14-18" [From tomorrow's winners to those from 14-18].

During this period, the Resistants of the department remained in contact with British services. Parachute drops of containers were regular and destined for all forms of resistance in the department. On November 3, an important parachute drop allowed the recovery of explosives and weapons, including 197 Sten submachine guns and 50 pistols.

Following the parade in Oyonnax, the government decided to carry out repressions in Haut-Bugey to prevent the population from sympathizing with the maquisards. After the failure of the attack on the Granges camp by 500 GMR, on 18 November 1943, a second attack was scheduled a few days later with 1,500 GMR. However, an agreement between Élie Deschamps and some GMR leaders avoided confrontation.

At the beginning of December 1943, Richard Heslop received a radio message requesting the sabotage of a power plant at Creusot. This plant supplied the Schneider factory which manufactured locomotives, artillery pieces and tank armor for the Reich. The maquis of Ain were to be supported by three teams from Saône-et-Loire. On 16 December 1943, the men headed to the Creusot plant where 80 German soldiers were on guard. About thirty explosive charges were placed but the result of this sabotage was a failure for the maquis: three dead, including an officer and no explosion, the charges having been either neutralized by the Germans, or inoperative because of defective detonators stored in damp places.

=== Repression by the Wehrmacht ===
==== German recognition of the military potential of the maquis ====
Until the autumn of 1943, German leaders entrusted the French government with the fight against the maquis. The organization of the parade in Oyonnax in November 1943 showed complicity between certain French law enforcement and the maquisards. In Ain, the gendarmes of Nantua and the police of Oyonnax facilitated its success. (Note: p. 100.) On the other hand, operations entrusted to the GMR often ended in reversal and German officers present in the department reported to the Prefect of Ain and German command the rise in power of the Resistance in the department. It was in this sense that the Prefect of Ain wrote to the regional prefect of Lyon on 27 November 1943:

I was able to get the chief of the Verbindungsstab (Note: The Verbindungsstab represents the German liaison staff.) to admit that the impotence of the French police was due to a shortage of manpower and insufficient armament. However, it remains to be feared that the German authority will intervene in the future directly against those it believes responsible. (Note: p. 101.)

After the Allied landing in North Africa, and even more from 14 December 1943 (following the parade), repression intensified in the region: the Germans carried out brutal offensives in the form of reprisals, executions and roundups. The first roundup took place in Nantua on 14 December. 400 soldiers were deployed in the city. Doctor Émile Mercier, denounced as the sector chief of the Resistance, was arrested then executed on the road to Maillat. 150 men aged 18 to 50 were deported to fill the gaps created by the increase in the number of STO refractories. (Note: p. 105.) The German soldiers then went to Oyonnax to reaffirm their power over a population impressed by the parade of 11 November 1943. They arrested and executed the mayor of the city, Paul Maréchal, and his deputy, Auguste Sonthonnax, before going to Arbent to execute the mayor François Rochaix.

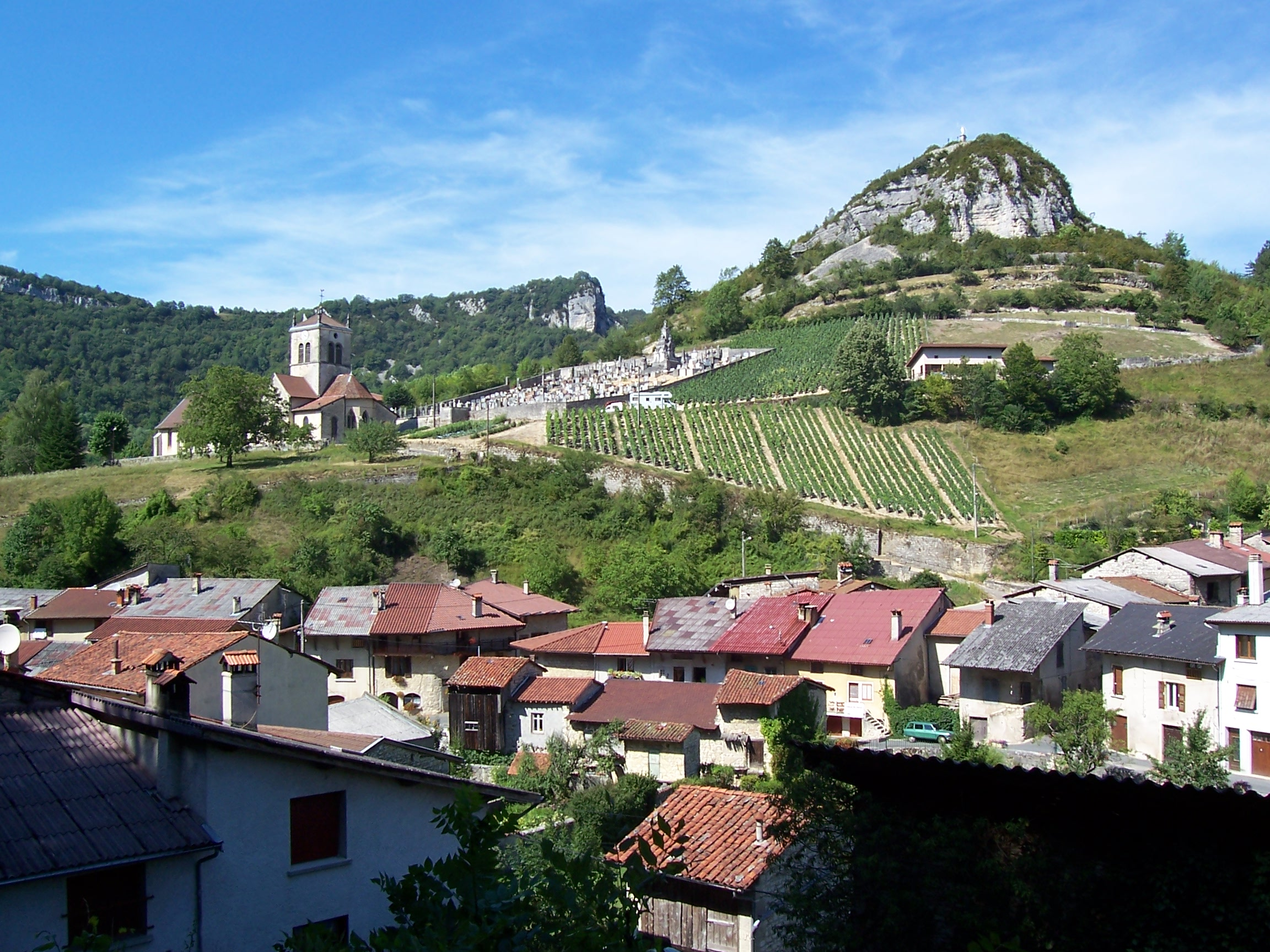
View of Cerdon.

Another report from the Prefect of Ain indicated on 4 January 1944 that the fear of a new German intervention was growing stronger. That of 26 January 1944 announced a large-scale operation planned for February. Localized police actions having no effect, a military intervention was necessary to put an end to the actions of very mobile maquisards acting in small groups. The scheduling of Opération Caporal was also justified by the multiplication of maquisard attacks against German convoys. On 15 January 1944, for example, men from the Verduraz camp attacked a car occupied by two German soldiers on the climb to Cerdon, near Val d'Enfer. On 20 January, two trucks each containing five tons of calcium carbide were attacked by maquisards in Bohas and, on 24 January, three German gendarmes were killed near Lac de Sylans. (Note: p. 102.)

==== Weakening of the maquis ====
On 2 February 1944, the chiefs of the maquis of Ain sent an order to the Pré Carré camp stipulating:

To relieve the Savoyards, surrounded on all sides, carry out diversionary actions. Attack as soon as possible the posts installed at Pont de Seyssel and disarm them. The prisoners must be directed without delay to the Grand P.C. (Note: p. 106.)

Thirty men were designated to carry out the operations. That same day, on a road near the commune of Hotonnes, one of the convoys composed of 17 maquisards encountered a column of three German trucks. (Note: p. 107.) The group of maquisards tried to take them by surprise and launched an armed fight. Thirty-two Germans were killed and twenty-five wounded before the maquisards, outnumbered, withdrew into the region's reliefs. (Note: p. 110.) Upon returning to the scene, seven mutilated and killed maquisards were discovered; three absent, wounded, were taken in by local inhabitants. (Note: p. 111.) One of the maquisards' vehicles, riddled with bullets, was hidden in a farm in the hamlet of la Rivoire in the commune of Hotonnes.

Opération Caporal took place between 5 and 13 February 1944. 2,500 soldiers were present in the department under the command of General Karl Pflaum. (Note: p. 109.) They locked down the main communication axes. The objective of the operation was not only the hunt for maquisards considered "terrorists", but also the elimination of all populations providing them with material or logistical aid. STO refractories who had not joined the maquis were also targets during the operation, German factories suffering from a lack of manpower. (Note: p. 110.)

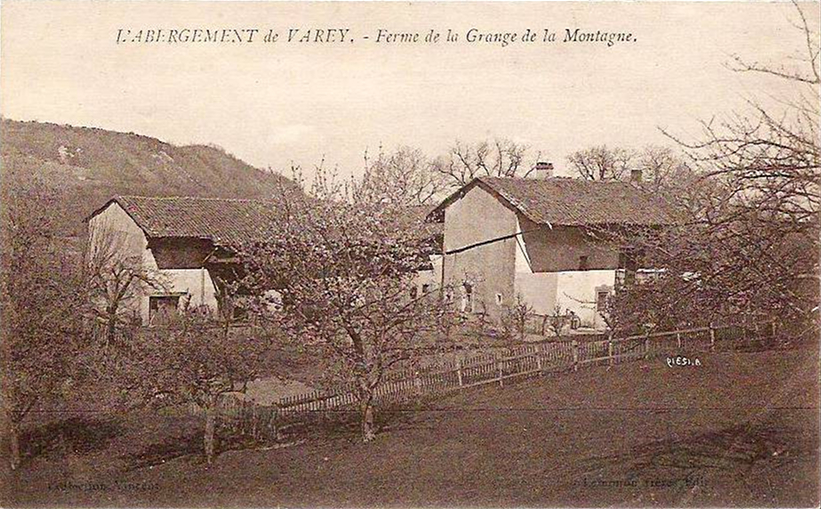
The farm of La Montagne.

A notable event of Opération Caporal was the attack on the La Montagne farm on 8 February 1944. The German hunt forced the occupants of the maquis command post of Ain to flee. The men found refuge in an isolated farm in L'Abergement-de-Varey: the La Montagne farm. But that morning, three hundred German soldiers encircled the farm occupied by 22 maquisards. The latter were forced to flee and ten men were killed as well as the German lieutenant Wegman and sergeant-major Braun, the German sergeant-major Conrad being wounded. (Note: p. 112.)

Opération Caporal ended on 13 February and imposed a change of strategy on the maquis. The maquisards had to become even more mobile and reactive; they gave up installing their camps in farms and created makeshift camps using foliage and parachute canvases. Material losses, in vehicles and food reserves, were also considerable. Henri Romans-Petit said that the maquis had "wheat and potatoes for a year (...) several thousand pairs of shoes" which were either burned or recovered by the Germans. (Note: p. 127.)

==== Reorganization and renewal ====
Following the German operation of February 1944, Denis Johnson and Richard Heslop transmitted the assessment to the United Kingdom. The large German device put in place revealed the strategic importance of the region: because of the war in Italy, the department was an important communication point and a possible fallback point. (Note: p. 116.) Anglo-Saxon support increased with the massive sending of weapons.

On 20 February, a report was sent to London by an agent of the intelligence service of the Mouvements unis de la Résistance who, after reading and annotation by General Kœnig, described the violence of the reprisals suffered by civilian populations and the torture used to obtain information on the locations of maquis camps. The report ended with a description of the population's mistrust towards the maquisards:

The inhabitants of Ain, for the most part, no longer want to hear about the maquis […] Can we blame these people after what they have suffered […] It must be said moreover that everywhere, to all German questions, the peasant opposed a stubborn silence. They did not give us up. (Note: p. 117.)

The maquis were thus aware that village support was now more difficult to obtain. Village mayors were often taken to task by the Sicherheitspolizei or the militia to obtain information on people providing support to the maquis. (Note: p. 118.) Some of them were even killed and homes burned.

On 31 March 1944 after Operation Hoch-Savoyen, the command of the military region of southern France ordered General Karl Pflaum, commander of the 157th Reserve Division, to annihilate the maquis in a region including the communes of Saint-Laurent, Clairvaux, Arinthod, Nantua and Bellegarde-sur-Valserine. (Note: p. 119.) The report explained the need for operations by the increase in attacks against railway and road convoys as well as hand strikes against property and persons, but also by the need to arrest men aged between 18 and 40 who had not responded to their summons for the STO.

In early April, intelligence showed the premises of a new large-scale German operation. (Note: p. 140.) However, in the maquisard camp, confidence was greater than before, the snow was gone, footprints were no longer visible. It also became easier to camouflage behind coppices that had leaves. The thaw also allowed considering sleeping outside, in the forest.

==== New German attack and response ====
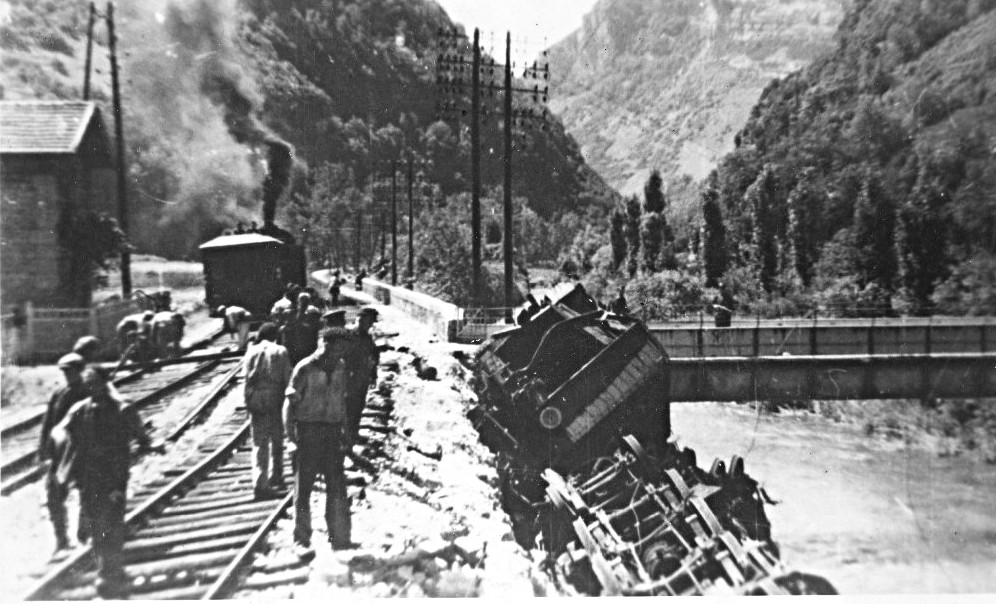
A train lying in the Albarine at the Reculafol bridge (Saint-Rambert-en-Bugey), following sabotage carried out by the Resistance on June 9, 1944. This photo was taken by a German officer on July 6, 1944, a few minutes before a maquis attack during which this officer would die. His camera was recovered by the maquisards and the film developed. In the background, note the presence of an armored train which was the real target of the first sabotage.

Operation Frühling began on 7 April 1944. The targeted regions were the south of the Jura department and the north of the Ain department, in the Oyonnax sector. It is estimated that 4,000 German soldiers were present. It seems that the maquis strategy remained the same (evade frontal combat and continue guerrilla operations). (Note: p. 151.) The camps of the North group of Noël Perrotot were dispersed and combat locations were occupied only for 48 hours. (Note: p. 121.)

An attack took place at the Thol camp. This operation aimed to divert by making the German High Command believe that the maquis were present in numbers throughout the Ain department, that is, in the regions of Bugey, Bresse and Dombes, while the forces were concentrated only on the Bugey mountains. (Note: p. 153.)

To counter German advances, the resistants of Ain ordered attacks on railway lines. Every night, the maquisards interrupted railway traffic.

The battle of the rails gained momentum at the end of May. The British staff ordered to "reduce all main switches of the Bourg station, otherwise (they) will send planes to carry out this work". The maquis of Ain contacted the railway workers of the station to obtain a detailed plan of the site. A few days later, on the night of June 6 to 7, 1944, it was the turn of the Ambérieu railway depot to be the target of maquisard attacks. 52 locomotives were put out of service, a turntable was damaged, two others immobilized for a few days and machine tools deteriorated.

=== Arrival of the Allies in France ===
==== Joint actions with the Normandy landing ====
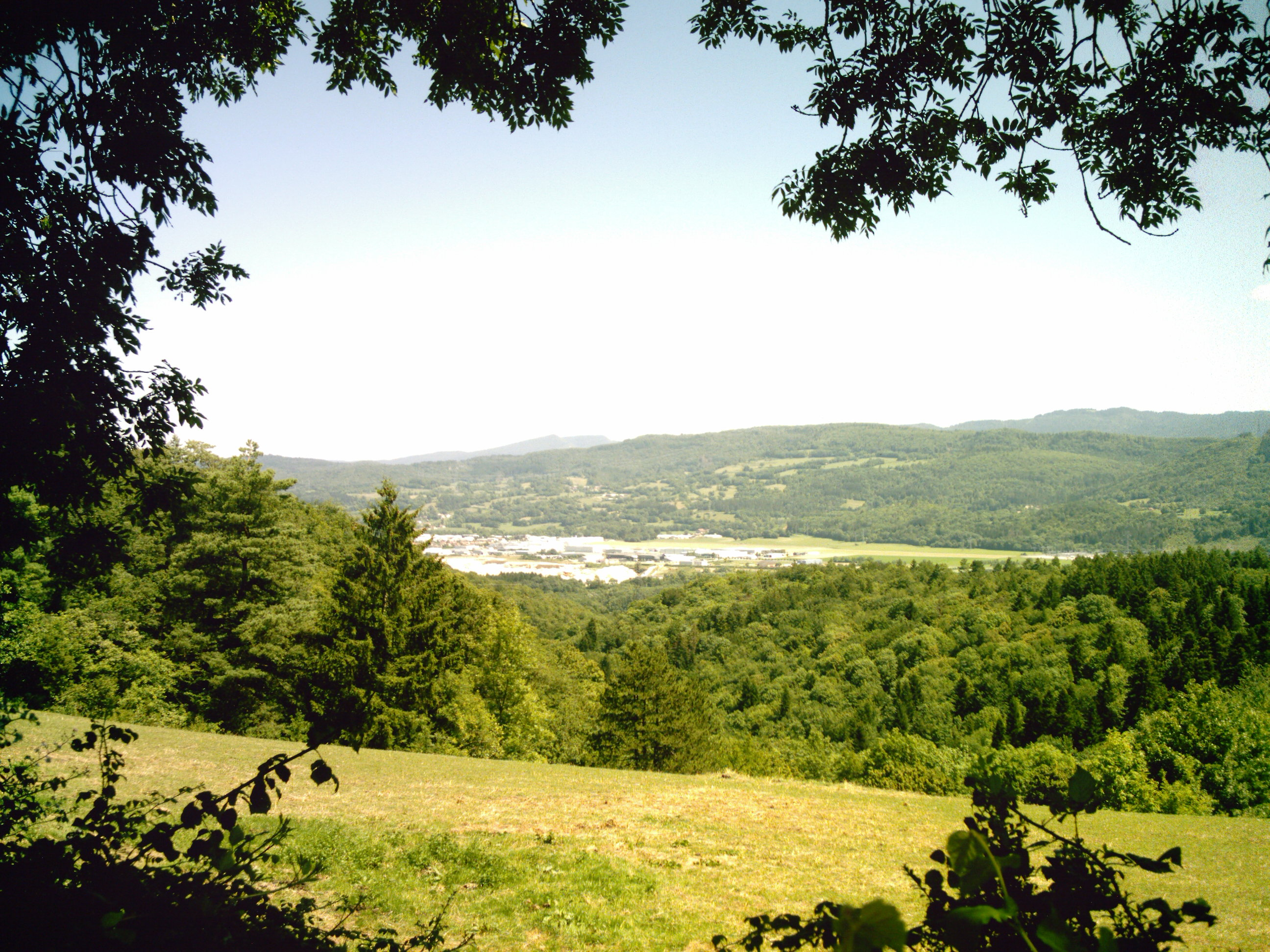
View of Izernore.

At the beginning of June 1944, Winston Churchill and his staff established a list of priority areas for sending weapons after the Normandy landing. Ain was in third position after the maquis of the Massif Central and the Alps. (Note: p. 188.) The Bureau central de renseignements et d'action also decided that these areas should become "advanced bases": raids against strategic objectives such as railway lines, airfields or fuel depots could be launched there (Note: p. 189.) to disorganize the Wehrmacht. (Note: p. 210.) The Bureau also wished that Ain, due to its mountainous nature and the military strength of the maquisards, constitute a "semi-liberated" or "controlled" area after the landing of Allied troops in Normandy on 6 June 1944. (Note: p. 190.) Grounds such as those of Izernore and the plain of Port could thus receive massive parachute drops of weapons and serve as landing grounds for aircraft.

On 8 June 1944, Henri Romans-Petit received the order to implement the Green Plan in the department of Ain; all forms of military resistance in the department were concerned: the maquis, the FTP and the ORA. (Note: p. 215.) All road and railway communication axes had to be neutralized. The chiefs of the maquis of Ain therefore ordered the deployment of maquisards throughout the controlled territory, their number was estimated by British forces at 2,000 armed men and 2,000 unarmed men. The Lorraine company had the mission of considerably slowing down the movement of German troops present in the region (Note: p. 165.) because the German staff wished to repatriate troops to the Normandy front. (Note: p. 166.) Sabotage of railway tracks took place every night for twelve days and various obstacles were placed on the roads by six groups positioned on a sixty-kilometer section between Lyon and Bourg-en-Bresse which carried out guerrilla operations.

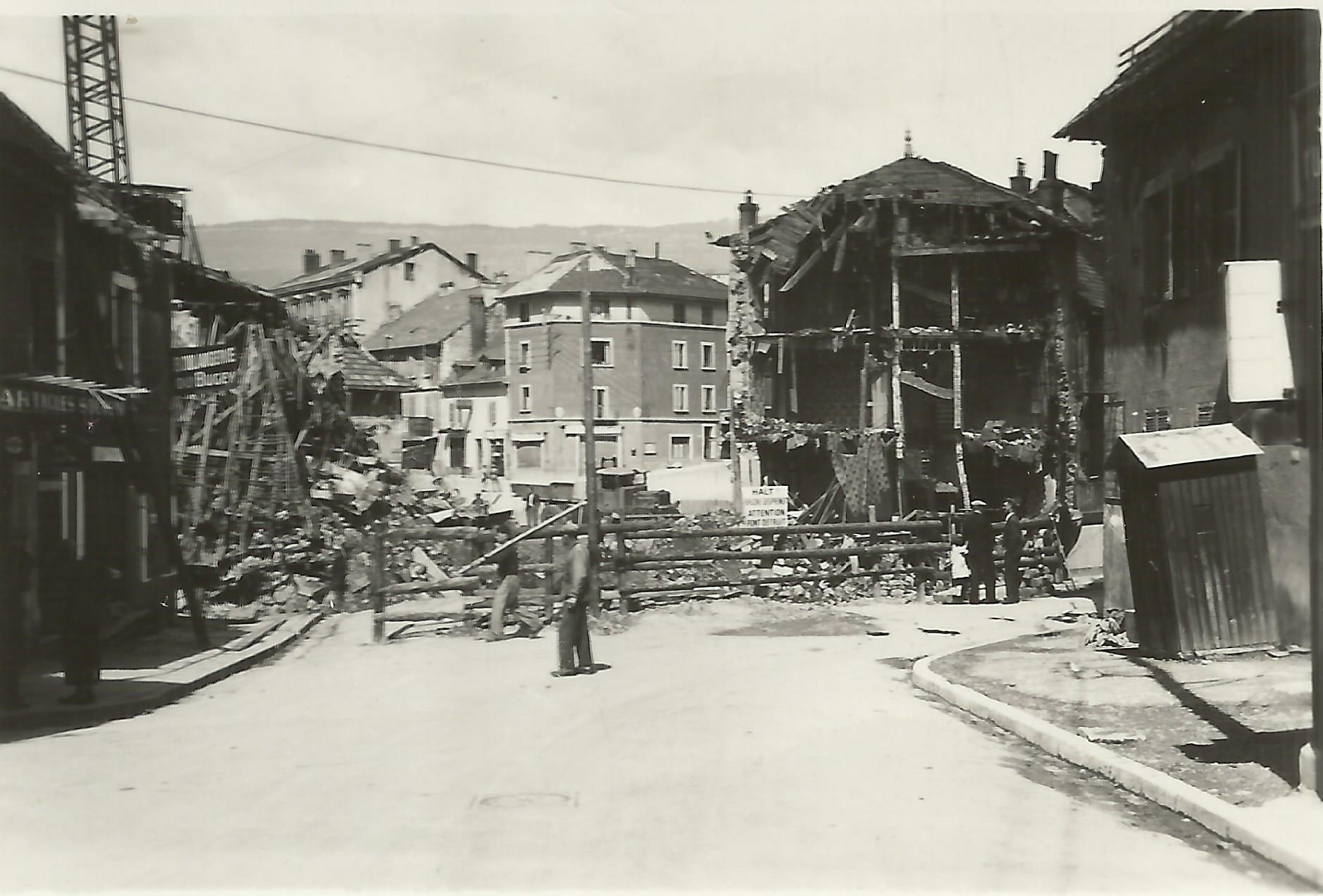
Destruction of the Pont de Coupy crossing the Valserine in Bellegarde

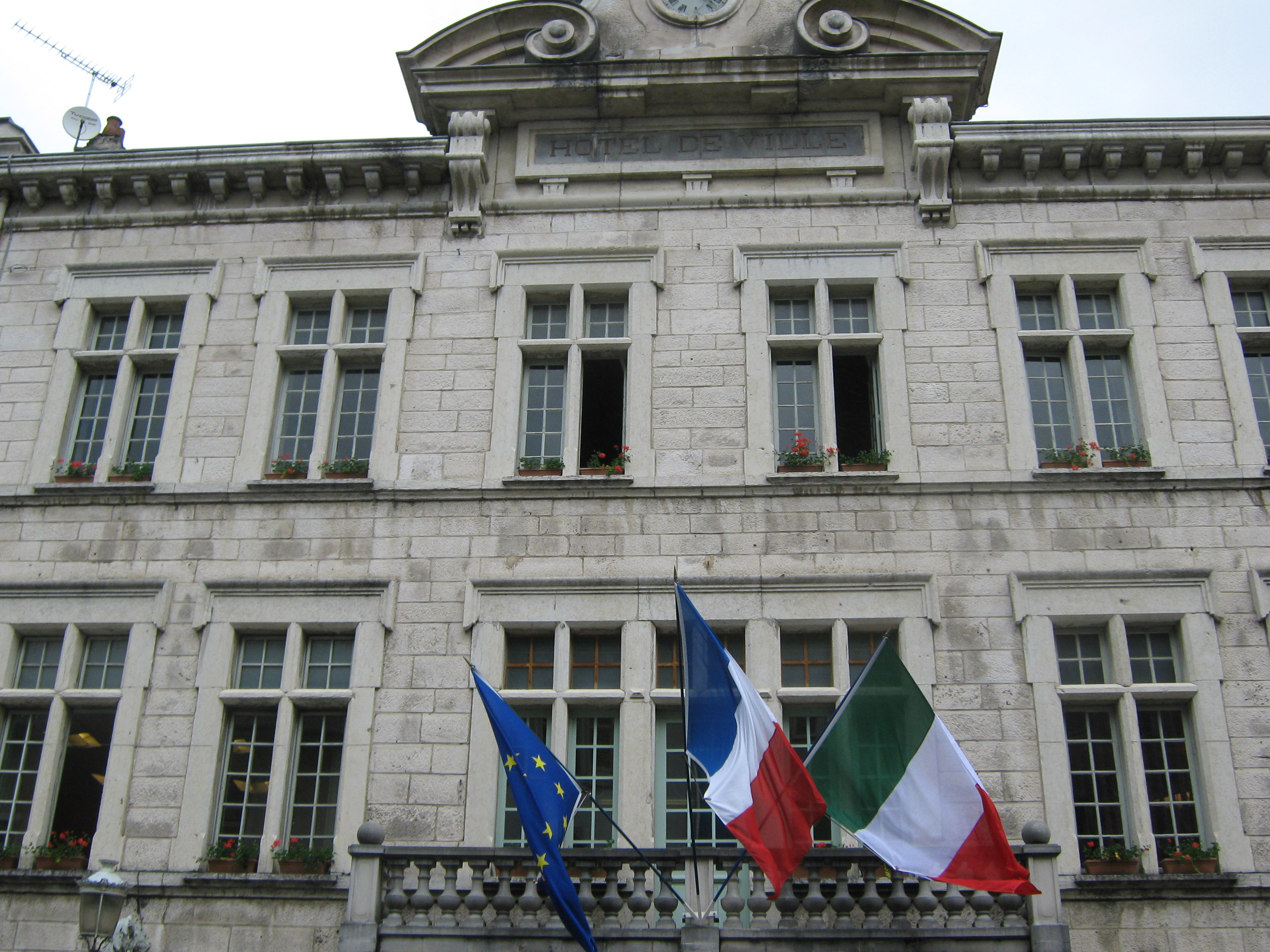
The town hall of Nantua.

On 8 June 1944, at the town hall of Nantua, Henri Romans-Petit announced the news of the landing and the beginning of a "Fourth Republic (Note: p. 214.)" to the local population. He prepared a new parade in the streets of Oyonnax which took place on June 12 by 130 men before a large crowd. Henri Romans-Petit was designated Prefect of Ain by Alban Vistel and Albert Chambonnet. The military Resistance of the department required the generosity of the farmers of Dombes and Bresse (Note: p. 222.) to ensure the supply of the population and the functioning of administrative services. (Note: p. 211.)

Throughout June 1944, all components of the Resistance in the department united to liberate the towns of Bugey such as Belley or Nantua. The occupation troops and the Feldgendarmerie were driven out without resistance on their part and communications were interrupted between Bourg-en-Bresse and Lyon. However, the euphoria that had gripped the department since the announcement of the Normandy landing worried the British staff. On 17 June 1944, General Kœnig issued the order to slow down the guerrilla, but according to Alban Vistel: "retreat means disaster [...] The enemy must be unable to bring reinforcements to Ain". (Note: p. 224.)

==== Last operation of the German army ====
As early as 11 June 1944, German columns were sighted in the sectors of Marlieux, Vonnas, Montrevel-en-Bresse, and Pont-d'Ain. Henri Jaboulay was worried about these advances and regretted that the neighboring departments, Haute-Savoie and Jura, had not been able to implement the Green Plan. (Note: p. 225.) The maquis tried to push back the German advance as long as possible. On 12 June 1944, an ambush was set against a column composed of eight buses and seven trucks. During their passage north of the village of Belmont, a bazooka shot destroyed two of these buses carrying German soldiers. (Note: p. 228.) The convoy was slowed down, but in revenge the village of Charancin was burned. Two days later the 157th reserve invaded Valromey. The maquis of Ain provided a rapid response to try to push back the Germans. (Note: p. 229.) The operation was quickly carried out around Seyssel. On 14 June 1944, three days after the takeover of Fort l'Écluse, German troops invaded Bellegarde-sur-Valserine. (Note: p. 230.) The maquisards being outpaced, Henri Romans-Petit ordered the withdrawal of his troops. (Note: p. 231.) Throughout June 1944, fighting between maquisards and the Wehrmacht multiplied, such as that of 13 June at Col de la Lèbe. (Note: p. 234.) The maquisards tried to keep the Haut-Bugey region free because the absence of German soldiers allowed a multiplication of large-scale parachute drops such as those prepared by Richard Heslop and which allowed the collection of 468 containers including 654 Sten submachine guns, 106 light machine guns, 630 rifles, 435 pistols and 35 anti-tank weapons.

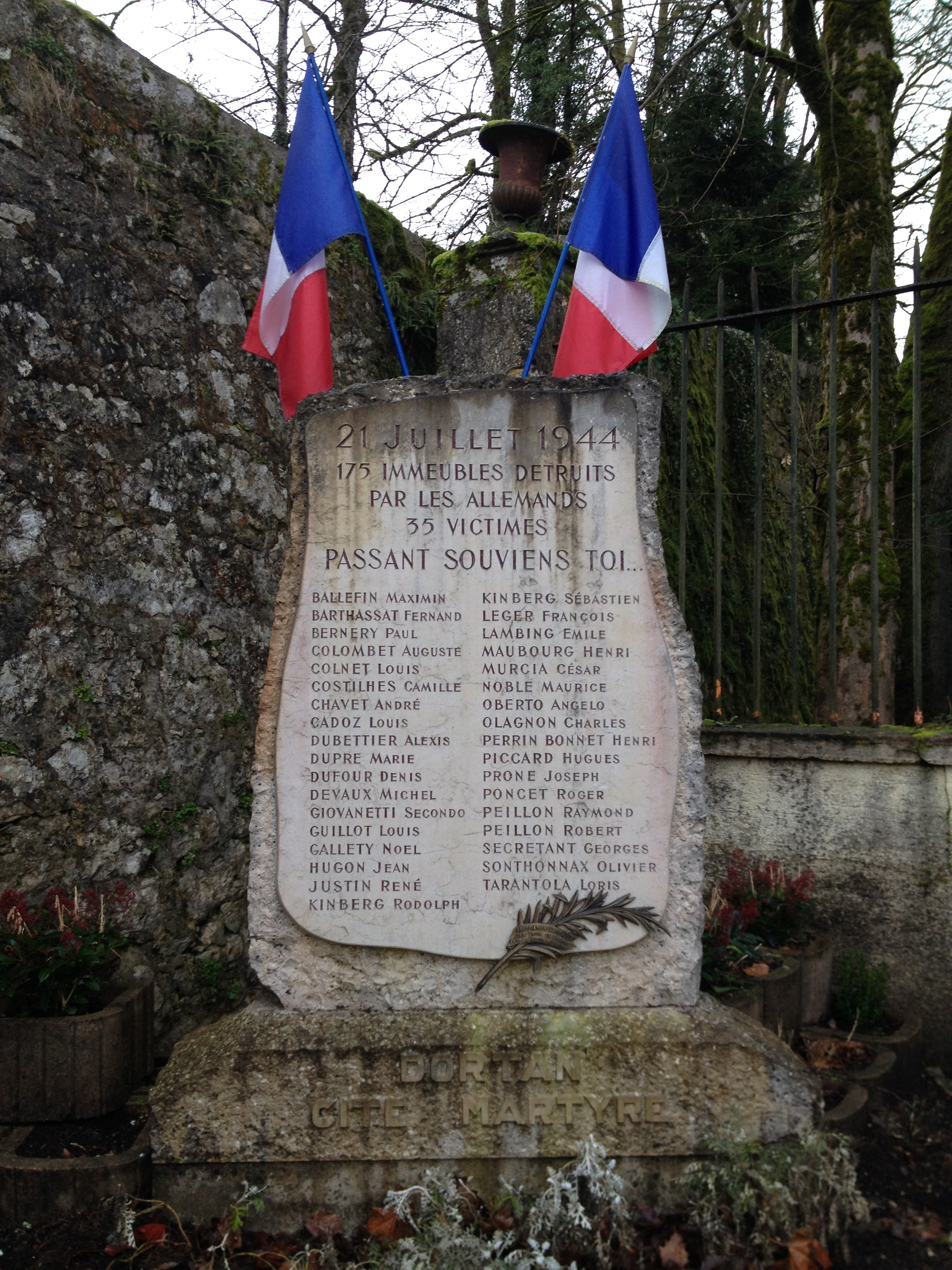
Martyr monument in Dortan.

The implementation of Operation Treffenfeld by the Wehrmacht in the middle of July dealt another severe blow to the maquis. During this period, the civilian population was the victim of revenge by German soldiers following the various maquisard sabotages. (Note: p. 242.) The railway lines being almost unusable, the populations were no longer deported but directly shot. (Note: p. 243.) Towns were looted as during the Dortan massacre between 12 and 22 July. (Note: p. 253.) The German objective was the recapture of the towns of Nantua and Oyonnax and the German strategy was the encirclement of the maquisards. (Note: p. 246.) 9,000 German soldiers were engaged in the operation and caused a significant loss in the region: more than 450 people, including some civilians, were killed. After the withdrawal of German troops on 21 July 1944, the local population expressed deep reservations about the return of the maquisards whom they judged the withdrawal into the mountains as an abandonment. (Note: p. 260.)

== Liberation ==
=== Decrease in maquis numbers ===
Following Operation Treffenfeld, the maquisards had to regain the trust of local populations. Henri Romans-Petit, leader of the maquis of Ain and Haut-Jura and provisionally designated prefect of the department, was contested. Members of the Mouvements unis de la Résistance, including Alban Vistel and the Departmental Liberation Committee, contested the decisions made during the last operation. (Note: p. 262.) Alban Vistel pointed out the reprisals endured by the civilian populations of Oyonnax and Nantua, towns included in the liberated zone and protected by the maquis until the time of the operation. (Note: p. 267.)

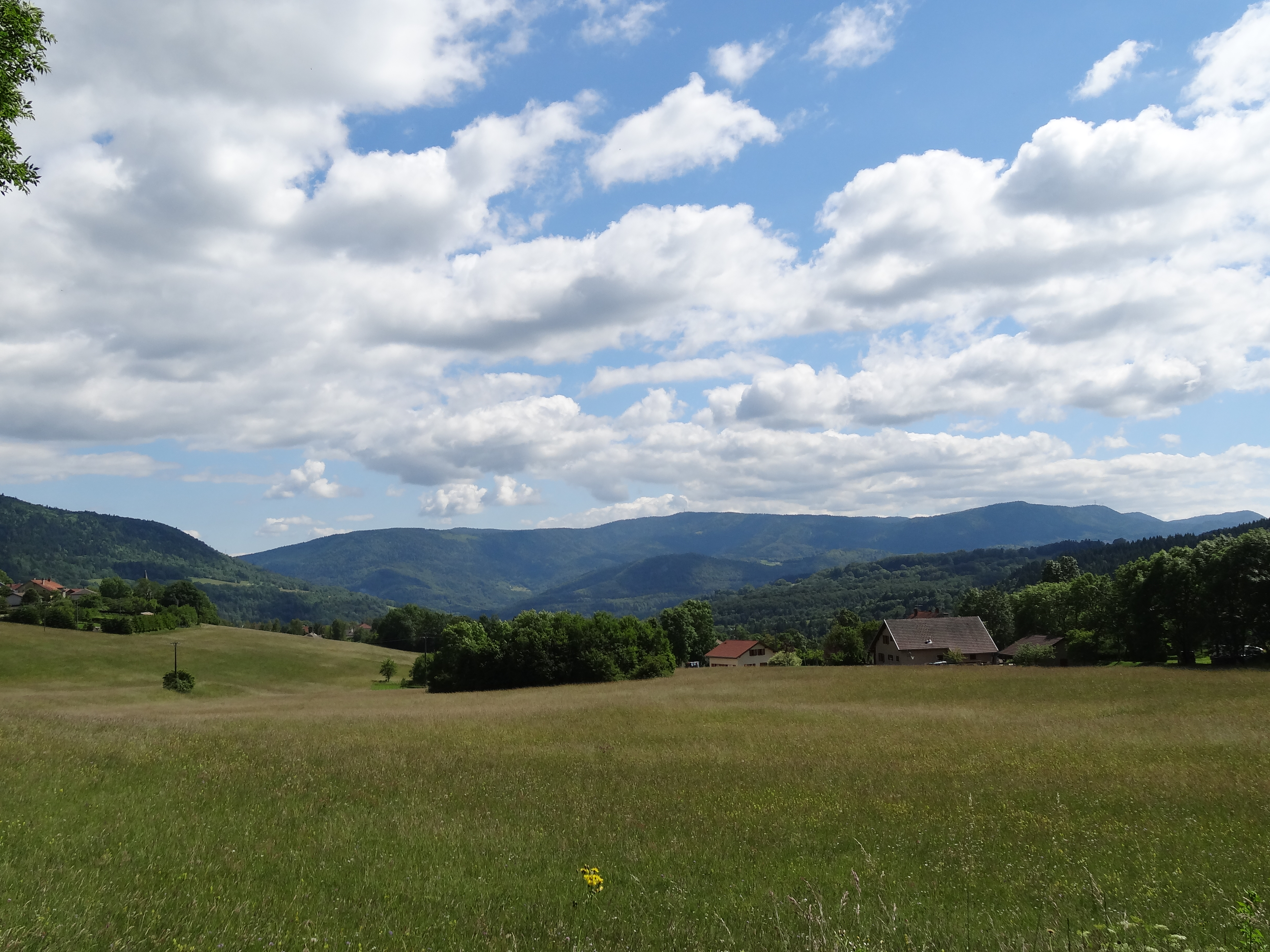
The meadow of Échallon.

However, the majority of the maquis men retained their confidence in Henri Romans-Petit. (Note: p. 263.) Richard Heslop, in London at the time of Operation Treffenfeld, also praised the qualities of the leader of the maquis of Ain. He sent a report to colonels Maurice Buckmaster and William Smith Ziegler quantifying the needs for weapons, clothing and supplies of the resistance in the department of Ain. A parachute drop was scheduled for 1 August 1944. (Note: p. 265.) In the meadow of Échallon, 38 B-17 bombers dropped 451 containers of weapons, explosives and supplies. 1,200 extra men could be armed. (Note: p. 286.)

On 2 August 1944, the regional command of the French Forces of the Interior gave the order to departmental leaders to relaunch guerrilla actions against the German army. The actions were to be carried out mainly on railway lines and German army retreat routes, as well as on roads bordering the Rhône valley. (Note: p. 287.) Telephone and telegraph lines had to be cut.

On 18 August 1944, Alban Vistel recommended replacing Henri Romans-Petit with René Bousquet known as Chabert at the head of the maquis. (Note: p. 276.) The latter refused and Marcel Gagneux was designated as commissioner for numbers, a position that allowed political control of camp leaders. On 23 August 1944, Alban Vistel wrote a new report in which he announced a change of direction. After a meeting with Paul Leistenschneider, (Note: Paul Leistenschneider was the regional military delegate for zone R1 in 1944.) Richard Heslop and Henri Romans-Petit, the latter was confirmed as leader of the maquis.

On 27 August 1944, Henry Jaboulay wrote to Alban Vistel to report a decrease in maquis numbers. Part of the members of the northern group decided to join the Francs-Tireurs et Partisans Français. (Note: p. 278.) These desertions mainly took place in the industrial towns of Oyonnax and Bellegarde-sur-Valserine where the French Communist Party was strongly implanted. (Note: p. 279.) The reasons given were that the maquis men wished to prepare for the post-war period and that disagreements between their leader and the Departmental Liberation Committee created instability. (Note: p. 281.) Henri Romans-Petit gave instructions to men leaving the maquis to leave weapons and supplies to camp leaders, but this instruction was very little respected. Noël Perrotot was designated as responsible for the lack of authority over his troops and the sections of the northern group were divided. The Michel subgroup was entrusted to Georges Béna and the Haut-Jura subgroup was entrusted to Maurice Guêpe. (Note: p. 280.)

=== Withdrawal of the Wehrmacht ===
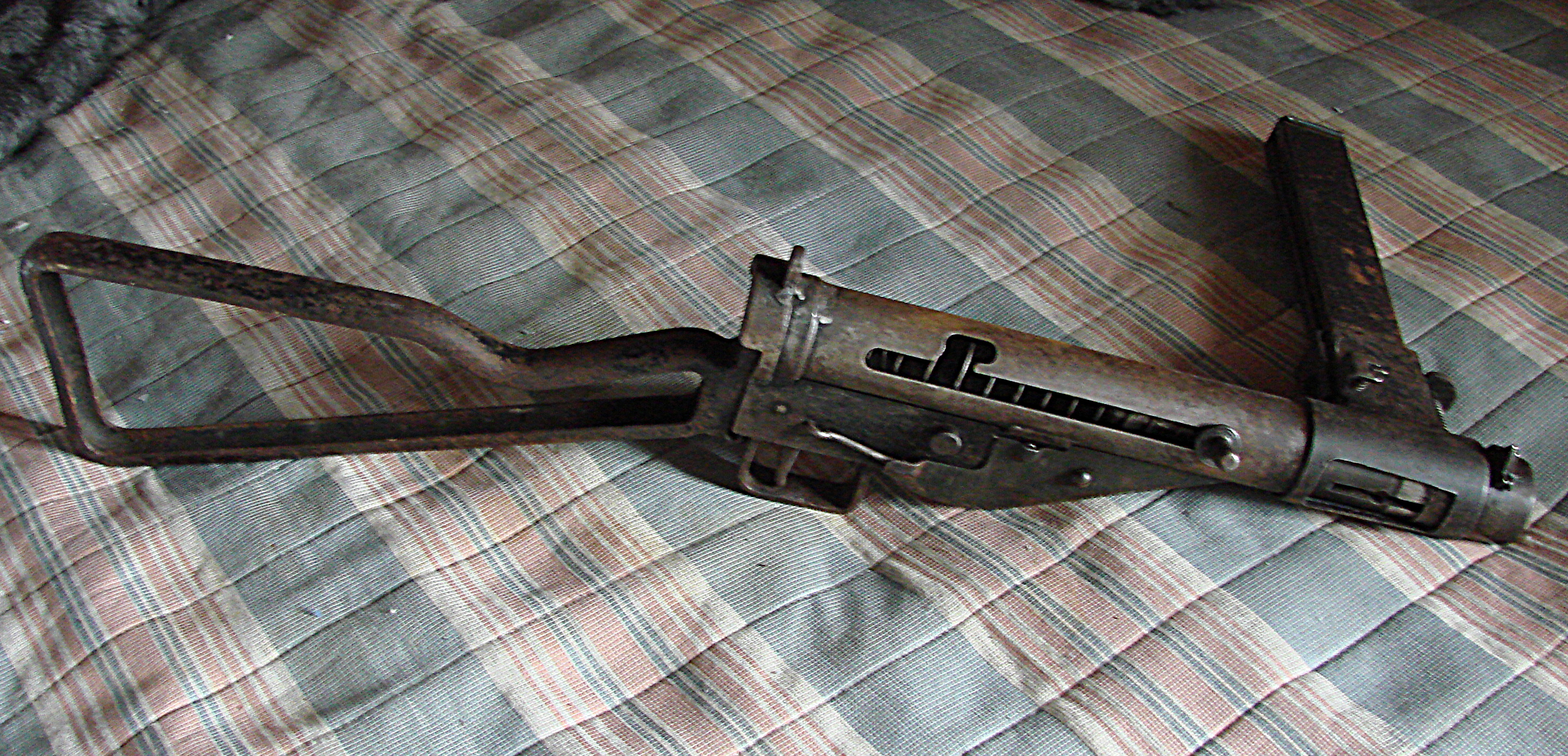
A Sten from the maquis of Ain (found in February 2015).

Apart from voluntary departures of maquisards to the Francs-Tireurs et Partisans Français, the approach of the liberation of the department created a new influx of men into the maquis camps. Parachute drops took place at the end of August 1944: 597 containers via the Marksman circuit and 210 via the Pimento circuit. 3,045 extra machinery allowed equipping the new Resistance recruits in a period when the liberation of the department was near.

Since the end of Operation Treffenfeld, the maquis of Ain and Haut-Jura was no longer a target for the German army. The towns of Nantua and Oyonnax were not liberated by the Resistance, but the majority of German troops were concentrated around the major communication axes between southern France and the northeast. These axes were to serve for the withdrawal of the 19th Army during the landing in Provence in August 1944. (Note: p. 285.)

The section leaders of the maquis decided to continue the fight. Henri Girousse sent his men to fight east of the department, towards the borders with Savoie and Isère as well as west, along the Saône, to help other Resistance members during attacks on German railway and road convoys. The lines between Culoz and Chambéry and between Culoz and Bellegarde-sur-Valserine were systematically made impassable. (Note: p. 296.)

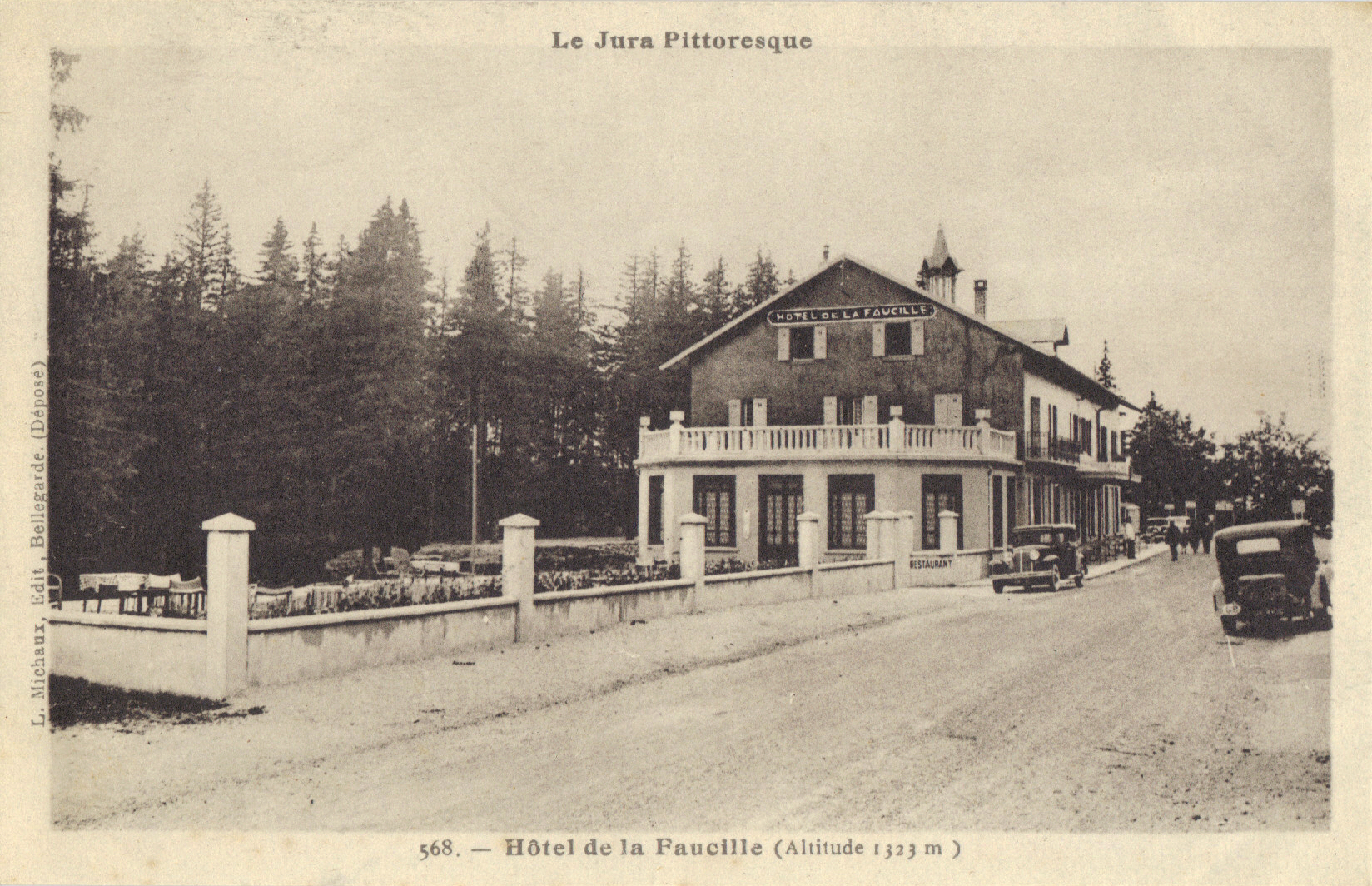
The Col de la Faucille.

Noël Perrotot sent his men to fight around Pays de Gex, at Fort l'Écluse and at Col de la Faucille. The mission entrusted to him was to monitor the France–Switzerland border to prevent the escape of Wehrmacht soldiers. (Note: p. 293.) He placed men at Col de la Faucille to prevent its crossing by German troops. The latter were thus confined in Pays de Gex.

Several sectors of the department were successively liberated by maquis groups: Culoz on 20 August 1944, Valromey on 22 August, the east of the department up to Ambérieu-en-Bugey on 23 August, Saint-Laurent-de-Mure on 25 August, (Note: p. 297.) Saint-Denis-en-Bugey on 28 August. (Note: p. 298.)

The Haut-Jura subgroup had to control the road linking Morez to Pontarlier. German garrisons were present in the Morez region and a clash took place on 28 August 1944. The maquisards managed to explode thirty tons of German explosives. (Note: p. 294.) On 2 September 1944, the Germans, encircled, tried to negotiate their withdrawal in exchange for assurance that they would not loot the village of Morez upon departure. The maquisards, assisted by the spahis, refused and launched an assault in the village. The sector was liberated on 3 September. (Note: p. 295.)

The 19th Army continued its withdrawal from southern France towards Mâcon and Chalon-sur-Saône, then to reach Besançon and Belfort. At the end of August 1944, the Meximieux region, already liberated from the presence of the German army, was on the convoy's path. The 11th Panzer Division was in charge of clearing all threats that could weigh on the withdrawal of its troops. The Didier camp was evacuated, the Chazey bridge destroyed and La Valbonne attacked. On 1 September 1944, the Battle of Meximieux took place. The American army and the FFI joined forces to fight the German camp. Tank battles took place and 2 September in the morning, after strong resistance that caused the death of 18 American soldiers and 50 FFI, the 11th Panzer Division left the town. The Germans had managed to attract enough American troops to this front to allow the passage of all German units north of Lyon.

=== Liberation of Bourg-en-Bresse ===
The capture of Bourg-en-Bresse was the ultimate objective of the liberation of the department. German convoys circulating around the town suffered attacks. The roads between Pont-d'Ain and Bourg-en-Bresse and along the axis between Lyon and Mâcon were monitored. A fight took place at Pont-d'Ain. The Le Bugey company took control of the road between Cerdon and Nantua.

On 20 August 1944, Richard Heslop met colonels Delaney, Hodge and Meyer who were officers of the 45th American division. They informed him of their strategy to attack Bourg-en-Bresse from the west and requested the support of the maquisards. (Note: p. 300.)

At the end of August 1944, Henri Girousse ordered Maurice Morrier to place men at Ceyzériat with a view to liberating Bourg-en-Bresse. 320 men from the Secret Army were put in place. On 2 September 1944, the 180th and 157th American infantry regiments, assisted by a section of maquis from the southern group, took possession of the commune of Journans. The roads between Bohas and Villereversure and between Bohas and Serrières-sur-Ain were also controlled by the Allies. South of Bourg-en-Bresse, a fight took place at the col of Sénissiat forcing the Germans to fall back towards Bourg-en-Bresse.

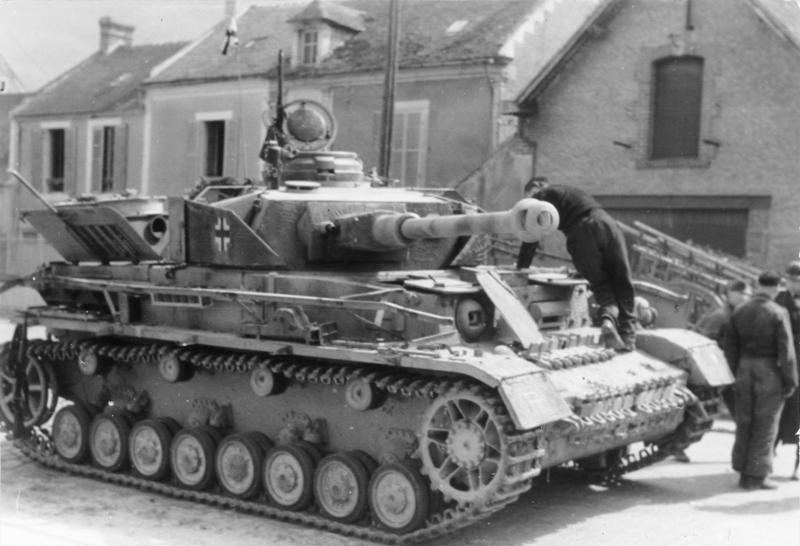
A Panzer IV.

After the liberation of Lyon, Major General Wend von Wietersheim, who directed the 11th Panzer Division, placed his headquarters in Bourg-en-Bresse. He had about fifty Panzer IV and Panther tanks. The north and south of the town were withdrawal axes for the 19th Army and had to be controlled by the Germans. Fighting took place on 3 and 4 September 1944 to allow the withdrawal of some German troops. (Note: p. 305.)

In parallel, the Allies delivered fights on 3 September at Malafretaz and Montrevel but without success. 723 weapons were still parachuted for the Resistance. In the night of 3 to 4 September, Bourg-en-Bresse no longer represented a strategic stake for the Wehrmacht which had withdrawn. The liaison staff and the majority of the troops had left the town. Only a few German armored vehicles were still there. On 4 September 1944, from the morning, two maquis sections invested Bourg-en-Bresse. They were covered by armored military vehicles American. The post office and the telephone exchange were quickly occupied by the maquisards as they were not monitored by German troops. (Note: p. 306.) The 180th American infantry regiment, supported by maquisards, destroyed the German artillery from observation posts. At 5 a.m., the prefecture and the gendarmerie were retaken. There were no more German troops, a French tricolor flag struck with a Cross of Lorraine was hoisted in front of the prefecture. (Note: p. 307.)

This liberation marked the end of the maquis of Ain and Haut-Jura. Some maquis men enlisted in the 2nd Armored Division or the 1st Army with a view to helping complete the liberation of France. Other men enlisted with the armies of the Alpine Front and the Atlantic Front, finally others returned to civilian life. (Note: p. 309.)

== Key events ==
=== 11 November 1943, parade ===
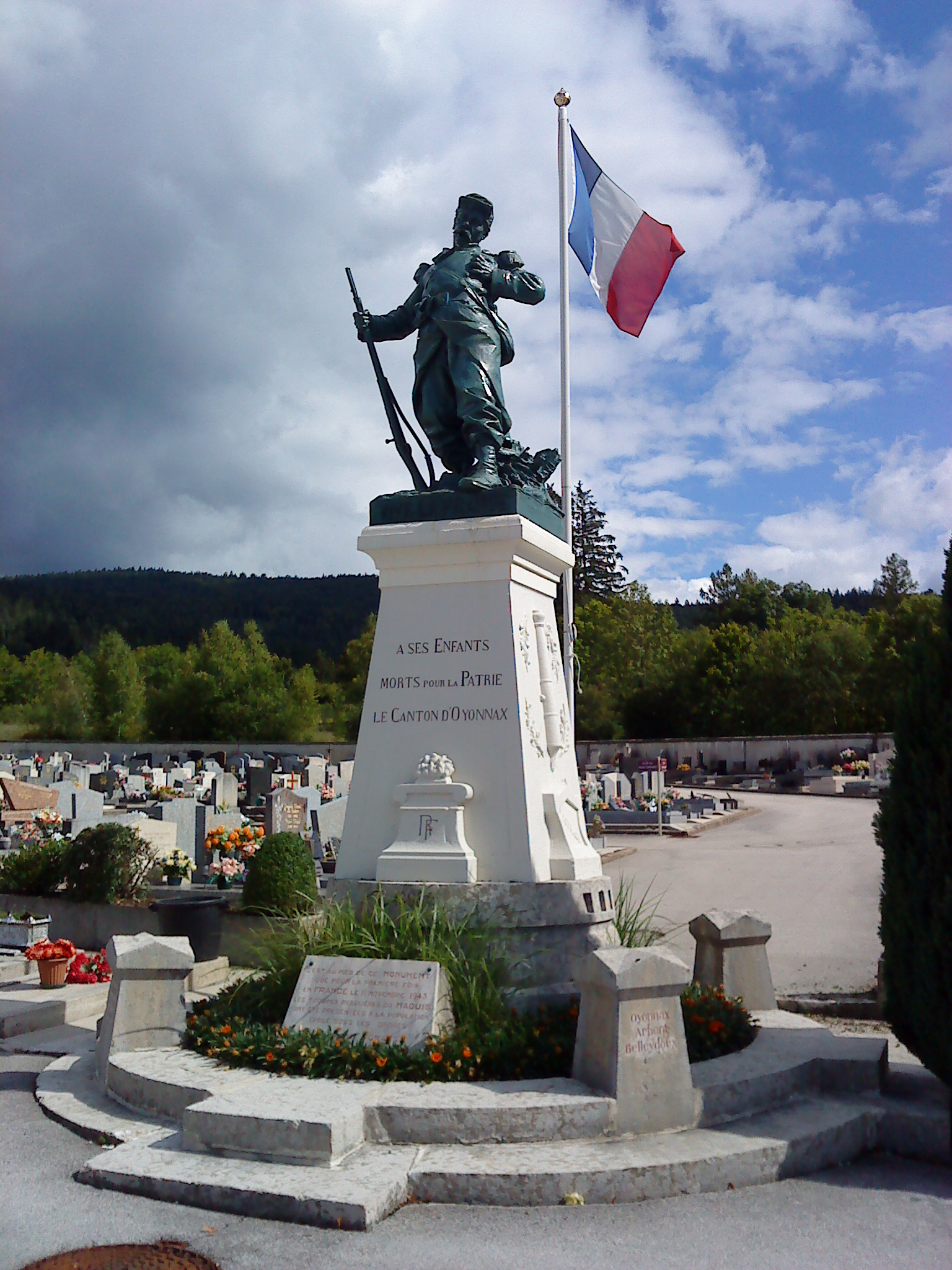
The wreath is placed at the foot of "François", a war memorial located at the time in René Nicod Park then moved to the cemetery (here in 2010).

11 November 1943 marked the twenty-fifth anniversary of the Armistice of 1918. France, under the government of Marshal Philippe Pétain, banned all commemorative ceremonies of the victory of the Allies over the German Empire. Despite the ban, the leaders of the internal resistance decided to lay wreaths at the feet of war memorials. The leader of the maquis of Ain, Captain Henri Romans-Petit, decided to organize a parade to counter the image of terrorists that Marshal Pétain gave to the maquisards. To prevent possible denunciations, several towns in Ain were initially designated to host the parade. The town of Oyonnax was chosen for the intense activity of the local secret army. The event was prepared by three Oyonnaxiens who knew the town: Noël Perrotot, Élie Deschamps and Gabriel Jeanjacquot. Two men were tasked with securing and neutralizing the town: Henri Girousse and Édouard Bourret, who obtained the cooperation of the police commissioner and the gendarmerie captain as well as the neutralization of the telephone exchange.

Around noon on this 11 November, about two hundred maquis from Ain and Haut-Jura, under the orders of Colonel Henri Romans-Petit, took possession of the town of Oyonnax. They paraded to the war memorial, marching in step to the sound of the bugle with the French flag at the head. They deposited a wreath in the shape of a Cross of Lorraine bearing the inscription:

Les vainqueurs de demain à ceux de 14-18.

During the parade, security was ensured by masked maquisards. These were Oyonnaxiens tasked with monitoring the crowd to spot possible militiamen or collaborators. Their masks, a white cloth with two holes to allow vision and slipped under the beret, served to conceal their identities to avoid reprisals against their families.

After a minute of silence and a La Marseillaise sung with the crowd, they left singing "Alsace et Lorraine" joining the trucks that took them back to their camps in the mountains.

A wreath bearing the same inscription — "Les vainqueurs de demain à ceux de 14-18" — was also deposited at the war memorials of the communes of Nantua, Belley, Hauteville, Meximieux, Seyssel and Saint-Rambert-en-Bugey.

In Bourg-en-Bresse, before dawn, the maquisard leader of the sector, André Levrier (alias Levêque, captain and leader of the company bearing his name), and his companions went near the pedestal where a bust of Edgar Quinet had been placed before its removal by the Germans, and set up a bust of Marianne struck with the letters "RF", for French Republic, and a flag of France with Cross of Lorraine. At the same time, a group went to the war memorial to deposit the wreath. When discovered, the Germans had everything removed.

=== Operation Caporal ===
Operation Caporal (Note: Operation Caporal is sometimes called action "Caporal" or action "Korporal".) was the first major military operation by the German army against the maquis of Ain and Haut-Jura. It took place from 5 to 13 February 1944, at the initiative of the German command of the armed territory south of France, Dr. Werner Knab military commander of the security services and police in the Lyon region, assisted by the militia and the Gestapo. 2,500 soldiers from the German Sicherungs-Bataillon to the division of foreign volunteers and mountain hunters composing the 157th Reserve Division were present in the department. They locked down the main communication axes. The objective of the operation was not only the hunt for maquisards considered "terrorists", but also all populations providing them with material or logistical aid. STO refractories who had not joined the maquis were also a target during the operation, German factories suffering from a lack of manpower.

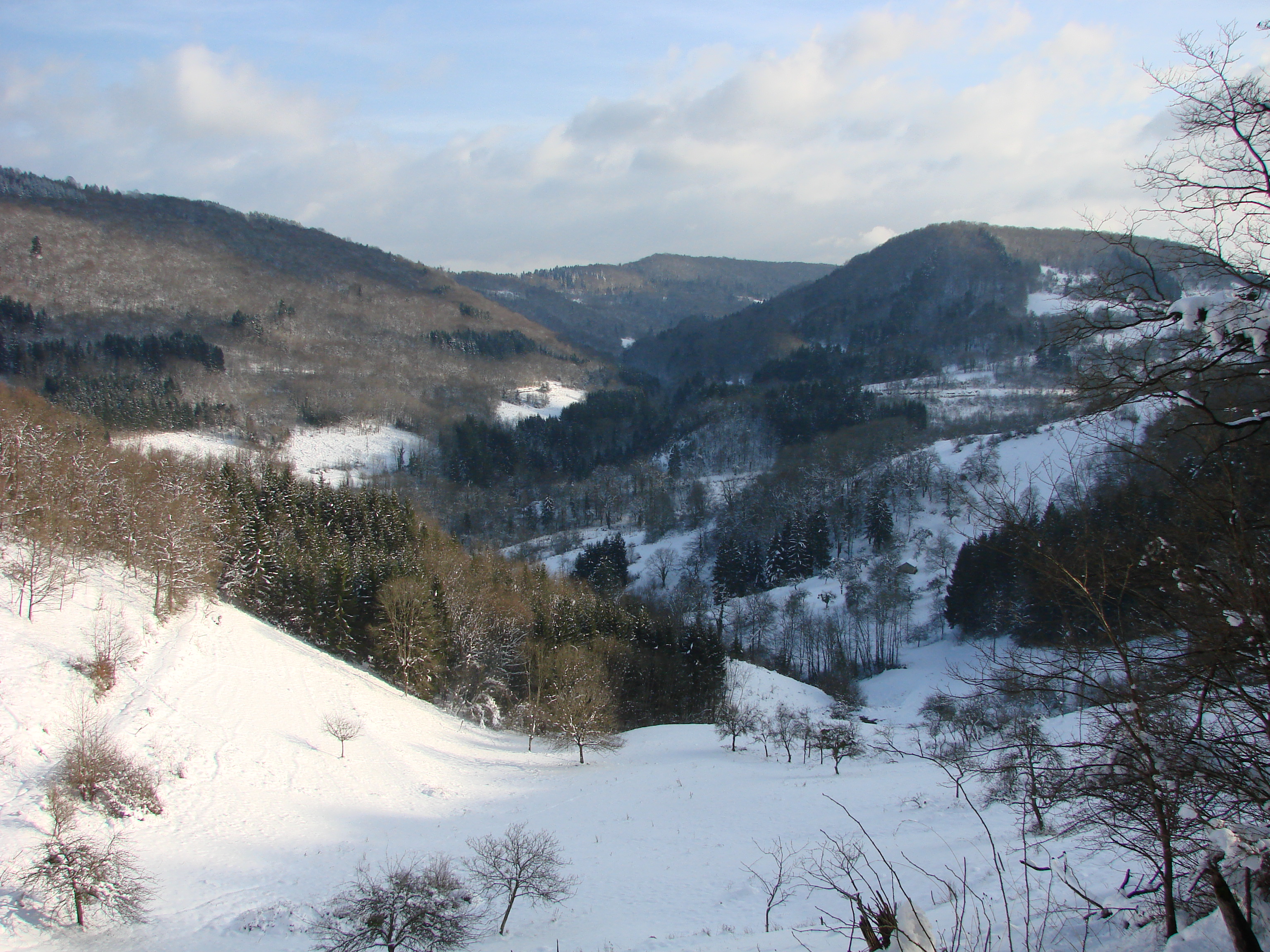
The surroundings of L'Abergement-de-Varey in February (Nivollet).

They had a significant device including heavy artillery and armored vehicles for mountain forces, an air fleet for terrain reconnaissance and a large number of military vehicles. At that time, snow was present and hindered the advance of German troops. For their part, the maquisards were also hindered in their flight as their footprints were visible in the snow. The first victims of the operation were the populations accused of supporting the French Forces of the Interior. Around the villages, farms likely to house maquis camps were burned and captured resistants were tortured and shot.

One of the notable events of Operation Caporal was the attack on the La Montagne farm on 8 February 1944. The German hunt forced the occupants of the Ain maquis command post to flee. The men found refuge in an isolated farm in L'Abergement-de-Varey: the La Montagne farm. Klaus Barbie was informed by a militiaman of the maquis retreat point. He obtained important information on the number and equipment of the men. In the morning, at dawn, three hundred German soldiers encircled the farm occupied by 22 maquisards. The latter were forced to flee. Julien Roche, one of the first members of the Ain maquis, covered his comrades but was killed by German fire like about ten other maquisards.

During the operation on 11 February 1944, a roundup was organized in Oyonnax. On denunciation, 27 people from Oyonnax and 30 from Nantua were deported to the concentration camp of Mauthausen.

Operation Caporal ended on 13 February and the tally gave 339 arrests, 287 deportations, 40 killed and 99 farms and dwellings burned, including maquis camps. Farms became too vulnerable and could no longer be used as camps. The mobility of the maquisards increased and forced them to make makeshift camps using foliage and parachute canvases. Material losses, in vehicles and food reserves, were also considerable. Henri Romans-Petit reported the maquis had "wheat and potatoes for a year (...) several thousand pairs of shoes" which were either burned or recovered by the Germans.

=== Operation Frühling ===
Operation Frühling was the second large-scale operation by the German army against the maquis of Ain and Haut-Jura. As early as 4 April 1944 fierce fighting opposed German troops to maquisards.

The operation began on 7 April 1944. The targeted regions were the south of the Jura department and the north of the Ain department, in the Oyonnax sector. It is estimated that 4,000 German soldiers were present. They came from the Sicherheitspolizei of Lyon and also from the 157th Reserve Division commanded by General Karl Pflaum with four mountain hunter battalions, a panzergrenadier battalion, an air protection battalion, a field gendarmerie unit, supply, transport and first aid companies.

The maquis avoided frontal combats and continued sabotage operations. To avoid a possible ambush and thus significant human losses, it was decided that the camps of the North group, under the orders of Noël Perrotot, had to be dispersed. Troops were not to stay in the same place for more than 48 consecutive hours. To counter German advances, the resistants of Ain ordered attacks on railway lines. Every night the maquisards interrupted railway traffic.

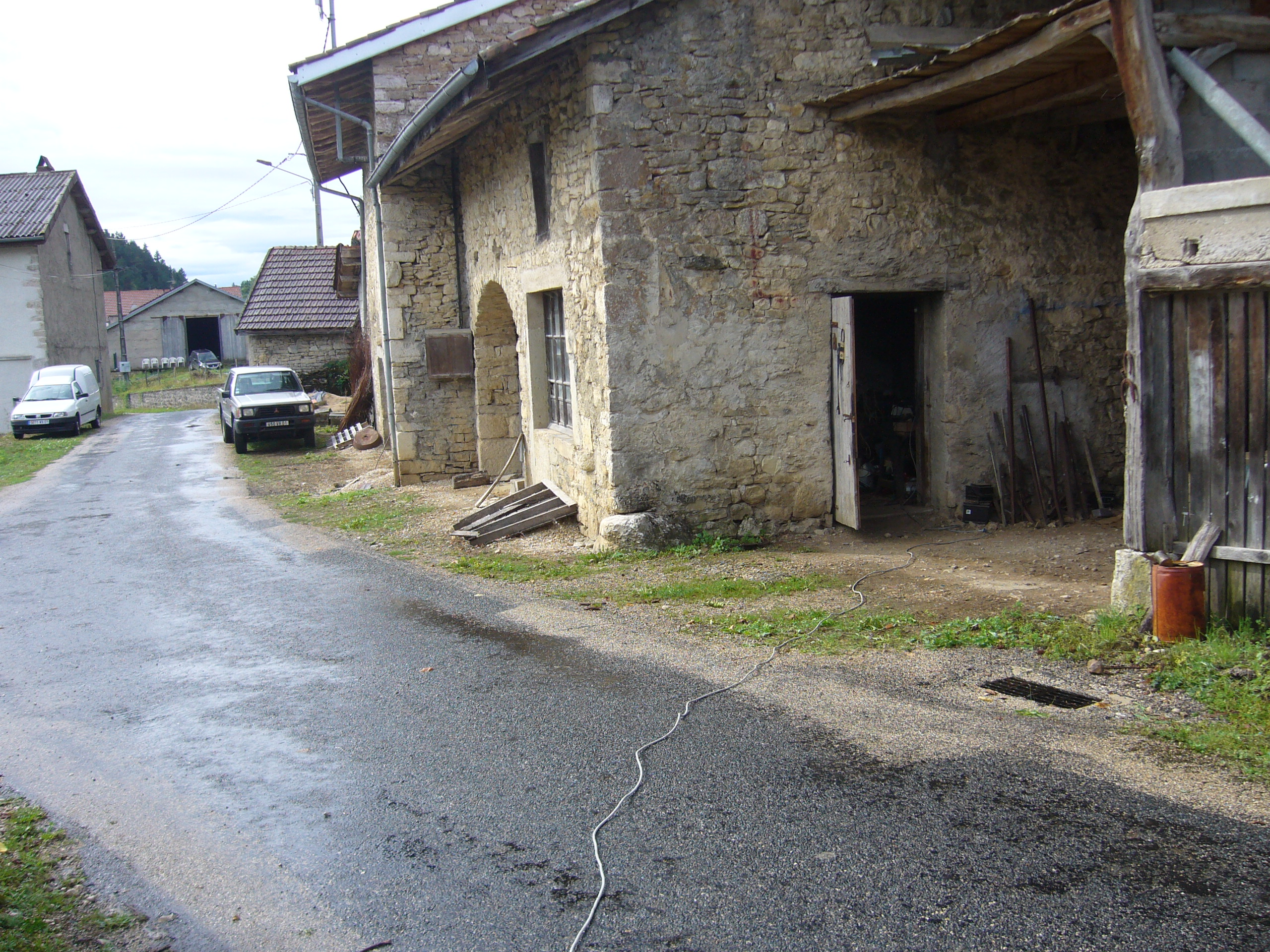
Chougeat: the maquis path.

To avenge maquisard attacks and the aid provided to them, the German army violently attacked the population. Tortures, rapes, murders were committed. Villages like Racouze, Chougeat, La Rivoire, Vernon, Sièges were burned. Tired of the repetition of repressions, part of the population expressed hostility to the Resistance and the maquis.

In Bourg-en-Bresse, an attack took place at the barracks of Thol. This operation aimed to divert by making the German High Command believe that the maquis were present and in numbers throughout the Ain department, that is, in the regions of Bugey, Bresse and Dombes while the forces were concentrated only on the Bugey mountains.

52 German actions took place during the operation. Eight had no impact on the maquisards. The Germans carried out 923 arrests, 148 executions, and destroyed 204 camps. The maquisards' equipment was massively destroyed: eleven collective weapons, 158 individual weapons, 134 vehicles were put out of service. (Note: p. 122.) The population was massively affected by this operation. It was the target of German reprisals. 199 people were arrested, 149 deported, 44 killed and 70 buildings destroyed. (Note: p. 123.)

=== Operation Treffenfeld ===
Operation Treffenfeld was the last major military operation by the German army against the maquis of Ain and Haut-Jura. It took place in the summer of 1944 shortly before the Allied landing in Provence because the German troops located in southeastern France needed a retreat zone.

The main German objectives were to recapture the towns of Nantua and Oyonnax which were controlled by the Resistance and to free imprisoned German soldiers. Operation Treffenfeld took place from 11 to 21 July 1944. The order was given to attack the regions of Hauteville and Nantua. (Note: p. 247.) On 12 July 1944, German troops took possession of Col de Richemond, Hotonnes, Ruffieu and Col de la Rochette. In parallel, a battalion was in place on the line between Bellegarde-sur-Valserine and Saint-Germain-de-Joux to block a maquisard retreat to the north.

Henri Romans-Petit, aware of the understaffing of his troops compared to German soldiers, decided to avoid combat. He organized sabotage operations against convoys to slow them down and allow the retreat of his troops. On 12 July 1944, a clash took place at Pont-d'Ain between maquisards and the Freiwilligen-Stamm-Division. Following exchanges of fire, Henri Girousse ordered the retreat of the men but, to slow German progress, they set up an ambush with the Verduraz and Louison companies on the Hauteville-Lompnes plateau along national route 84. (Note: p. 252.)

For its part, the northern group had to maintain a defense zone around Oyonnax. The German army arrived from Dijon, Dole and Besançon, it attempted an encirclement maneuver passing through the roads of Orgelet, Thoirette, Izernore on one hand and Saint-Claude, Dortan, Oyonnax on the other. Noël Perrotot distributed units in the sector and set up a strategy to maintain positions. The German advance was slowed from Jura, but the troops progressed. On 12 July 1944, they participated in the Dortan massacre then took Oyonnax on 14 July 1944.

East of the department, a section of the Lorraine company under the command of Léon Boghossian and sedentary members of the Secret Army led by André Lamblot tried to contain the 157th Reserve Division. The fighting took place at Saint-Germain-de-Joux. The German soldiers used the local population as "human shield" and advanced. The maquisards being encircled, Henri Romans-Petit gave the order to André Lamblot to retreat on 12 July 1944.

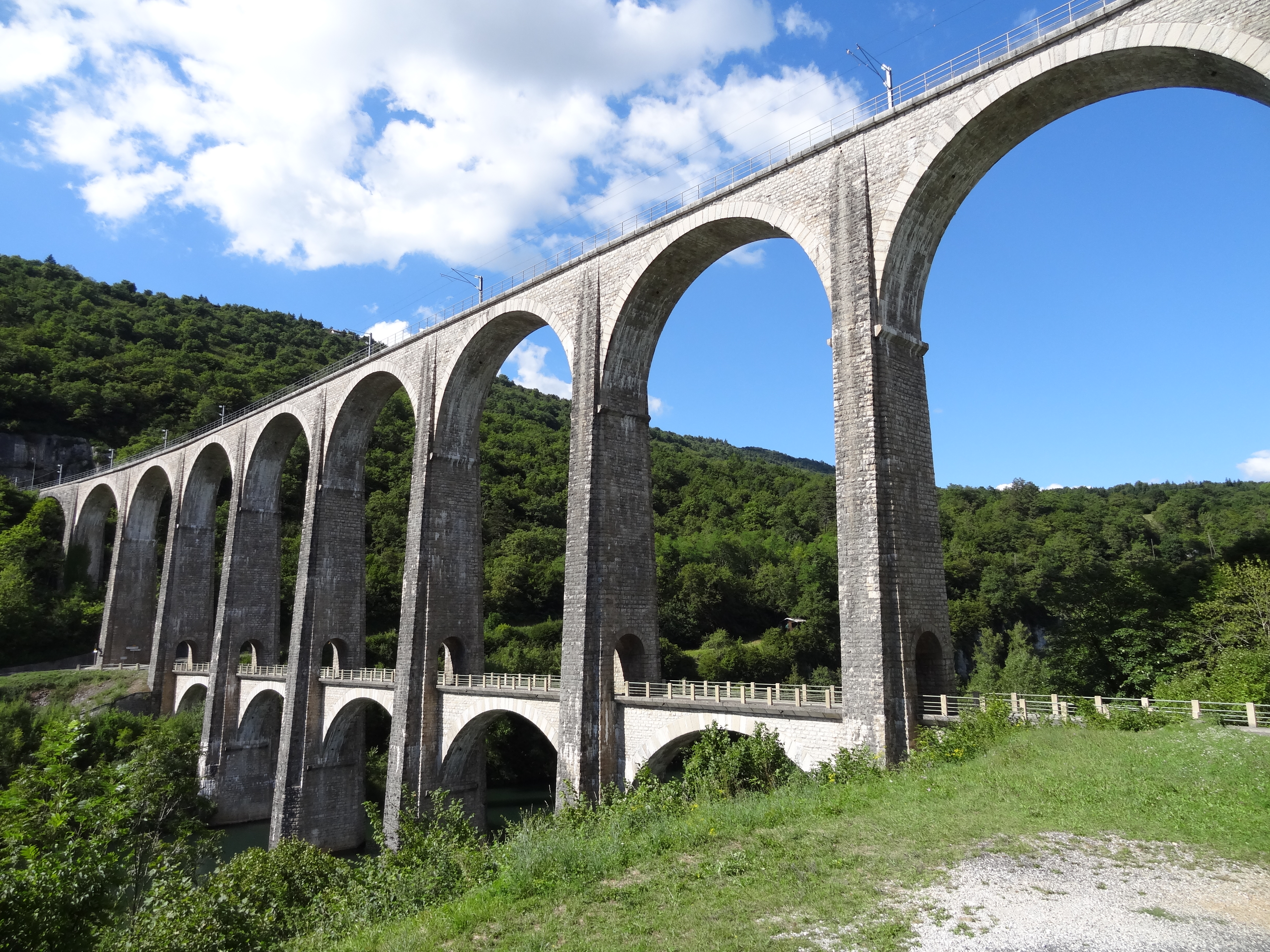
The Cize-Bolozon viaduct.

The western group had the mission to intercept German convoys departing from Bourg-en-Bresse. They used the Ain river as a defense line. On 11 July 1944, German soldiers threatened Neuville-sur-Ain then the Suran valley. The men of the western group set up ambushes along the German progress. (Note: p. 254.) On 12 July, the sections responded to the retreat order and, to cover their rear, destroyed part of the Cize–Bolozon viaduct and the Serrières-sur-Ain bridge. (Note: p. 255.)

The operation ended with the departures of the two German divisions which went to Vercors. No German soldier was left around Oyonnax and Nantua and the population of these two towns, the most affected during the operation, felt that the maquisards had abandoned them during the operation. They feared that the maquis would return and bring with them an increase in looting, then new German operations. (Note: p. 259.)

=== Battle of the rails ===
During the history of the maquis of Ain and Haut-Jura, the battle of the rails represented all the sabotage actions committed by the maquisards on the railway installations of the department. (Note: p. 159.) These actions were sometimes carried out with the complicity of railway workers, other resistance groups — FTPF, AS, franc-tireurs — or at the request of the Allies. The battle of the rails was an important stake for the departmental Resistance and the Allies because the Ain department was a railway crossroads for the mobility of German divisions. The largest railway depots in the department were those of Bellegarde-sur-Valserine, Bourg-en-Bresse and Ambérieu-en-Bugey, they were regularly targeted by attacks. (Note: p. 167.)

The two means of attacking railway installations were bombing or sabotage of electrical installations, rolling stock or tracks. Throughout the occupation period, the strategy of the department's Resistance was to carry out sabotage actions. (Note: p. 160.) Only one Allied bombing took place on 25 May 1944 on the Ambérieu-en-Bugey railway depot, but it only caused collateral damage, killed a switchman and nine civilians, and injured twenty. (Note: p. 161.)

==== First battle of the rails ====
As early as 1943, on the Ambérieu to Culoz line small sabotages were committed: in March, transmission wires of the red disk were cut near Saint-Rambert-en-Bugey station. (Note: p. 107.) The Cluse des Hôpitaux and Albarine, on the same line, was particularly conducive to attacks. On 2 October 1943, eight explosive devices were discovered between Tenay and La Burbanche.

Sabotages multiplied in 1943 and several forms of Resistance participated. They were committed either by using explosive charges; or by seizing the bearings of wagons with sand; or by removing the spike that fix the rails on the sleepers; or by piercing tank wagons; or by placing false labels indicating wrong directions. (Note: p. 163.)

The inter-allied maquis mission Musc, prepared in September 1943 by the Special Operations Executive, made priority the sabotage actions of railway installations. The BCRA, not having the same priority, even worried to Jean Rosenthal about the place taken by the execution of these at the expense of training in guerrilla. The latter then drew up the balance of 81 locomotives put out of use between September and December 1943.

At the end of 1943, surveillance of the tracks passed under German forces control, but this did not slow down the maquisards' actions. A report from the Direction centrale des Renseignements généraux and the National Gendarmerie noted that on 12 January 1944 two sites were attacked simultaneously: the Bellegarde-sur-Valserine railway depot where twelve machines and a signal box were destroyed by explosives; and La Cluse station where two machines were targeted by explosives. On 16 January 1944, a new operation at the Bourg-en-Bresse depot allowed eleven other locomotives to be put out of service. (Note: p. 164.)

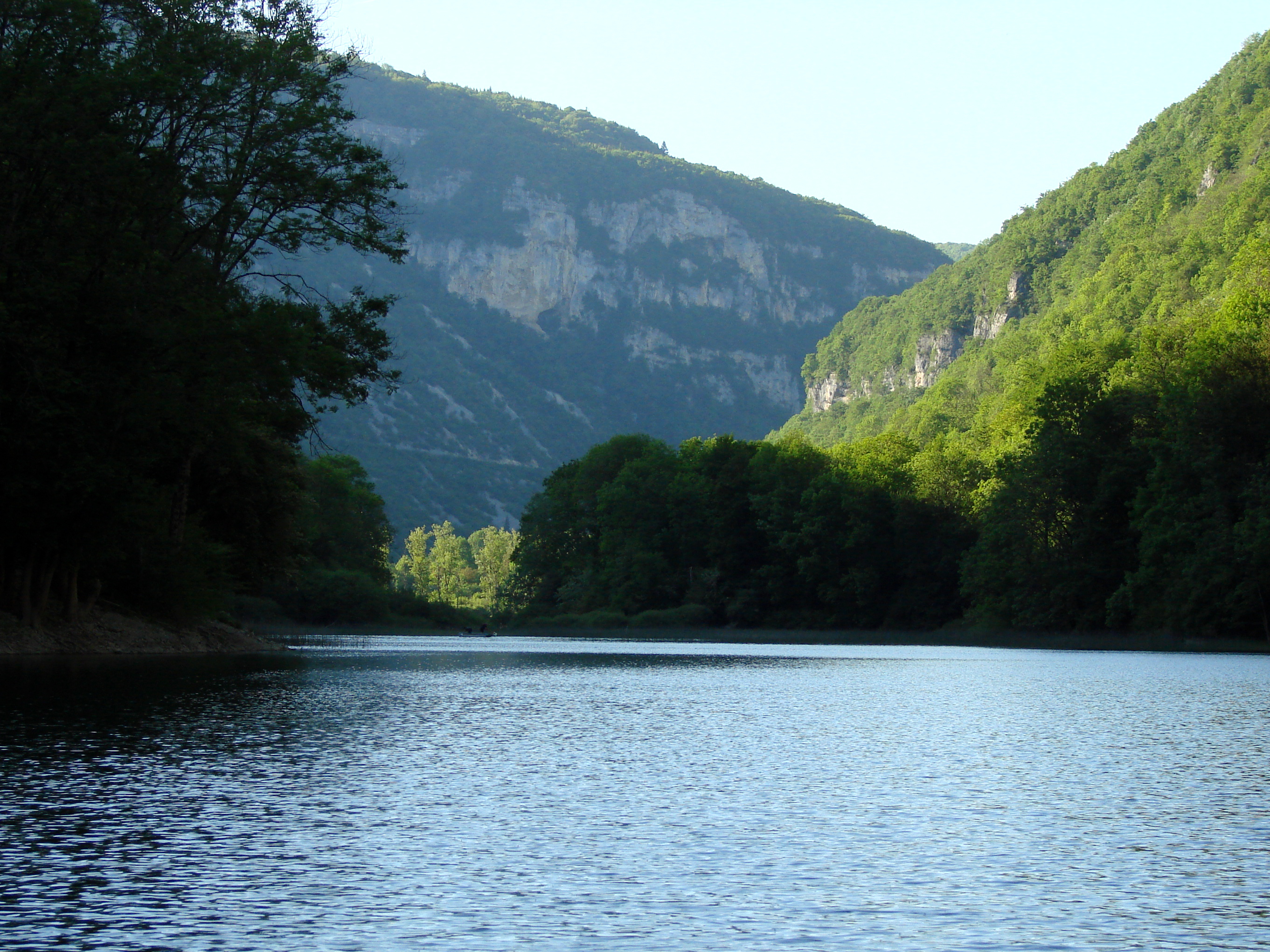
The Lac des Hôpitaux, between Tenay and La Burbanche. The railway line runs along the lake on the left, just behind the trees.

On the line between Torcieu and La Burbanche attacks multiplied. Three sabotages took place in December 1943 and January 1944 then on 25, 29 and 30 March 1944, on the same route, three convoys were targeted, causing the derailment of 24 wagons in total. From April to early June 1944, 27 wagons, six cars and one machine were victims of seven other sabotages. (Note: p. 169.)

Over the entire department network, between January and April 1944, 114 sabotages against railway tracks were recorded. (Note: p. 166.) Between January and May 1944, 368 machines were put out of use including 79 locomotives.

==== Implementation of the Vert Plan ====
During the end of 1943 and the first quarter of 1944, the Resistance staff located in London prepared a global plan to interrupt railway traffic and sabotage the lines most used by the Wehrmacht: the Vert Plan. This plan aimed to intensify sabotage actions with the Normandy landing, but offered Resistants the possibility not to wait for that day. Detailed plans of the tracks and portions to destroy were sent to regional military delegates in France. (Note: p. 162.) Henri Girousse received the Green Plan instructions as early as December 1943.

On 2 June 1944, the attack on Bourg-en-Bresse station by about a hundred maquisards allowed fifteen locomotives and a turntable to be put out of use. (Note: p. 171.)

On the evening of the landing, 6 June 1944, the southern group destroyed 52 locomotives at the Ambérieu depot, the most important railway node in the department. This attack was prepared with the complicity of railway workers. In groups of ten, the maquisards penetrated the warehouse to place explosive charges while the alert was given to German troops. 52 locomotives, a turntable and ten machine tools were thus destroyed. One maquisard was injured, three Germans killed and several wounded.

On 6 June 1944, the landing of Allied troops took place in Normandy. The German staff wished to repatriate troops to the Normandy front. Upon learning this, the leaders of the Ain maquis ordered the deployment of maquisards throughout the controlled territory. To counter German advances and in preparation for the general insurrection, the resistance had established from London the Green Plan intended to interrupt communications by roads or railway tracks. Every night the maquisards interrupted railway traffic.

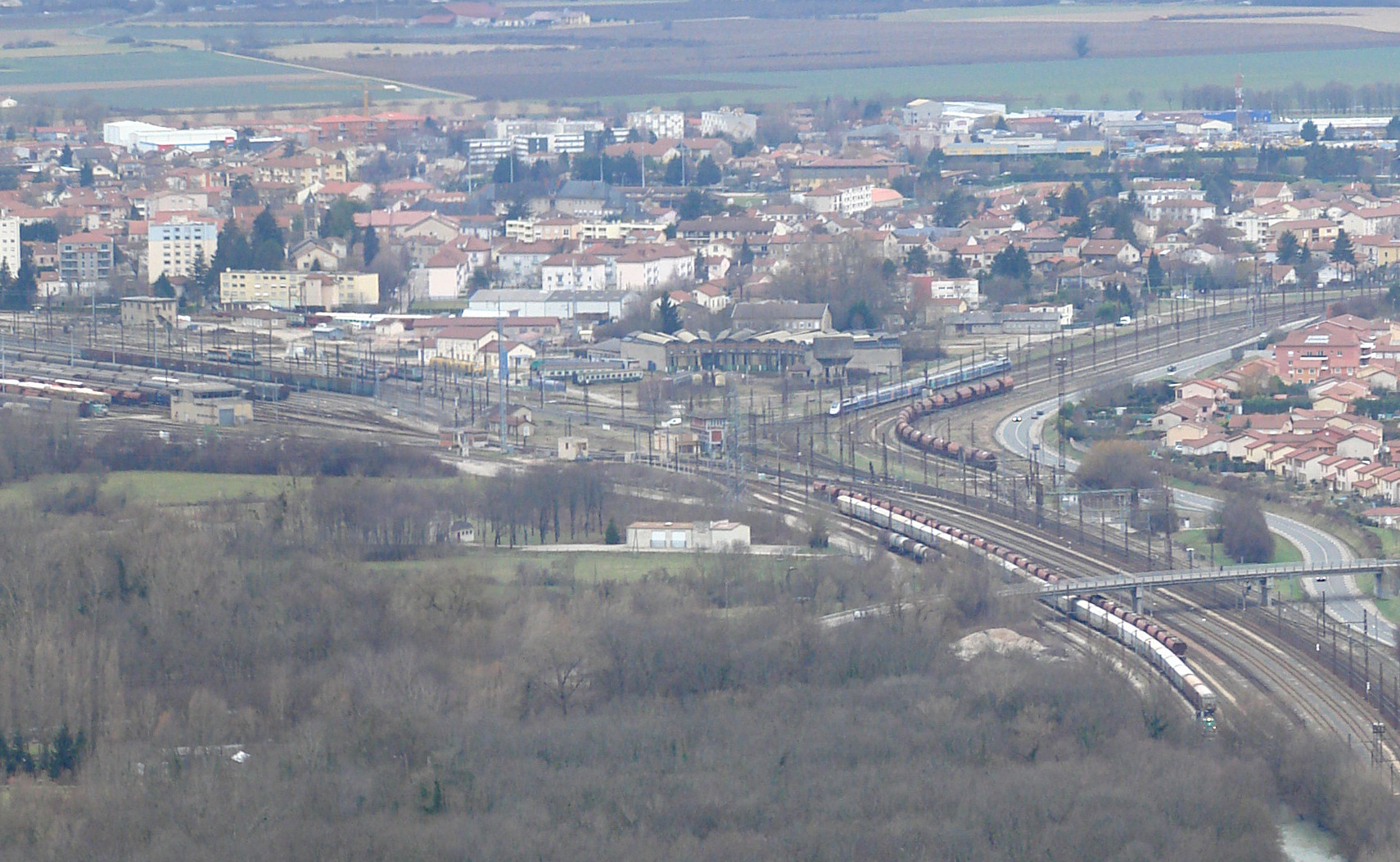
View of the Ambérieu-en-Bugey railway depot.

In the night of 6 to 7 June 1944 the sabotage of the Ambérieu-en-Bugey railway depot took place. The action was carried out jointly by men from the Verduraz group and the Nicole camp, military school children from the Autun Military Preparatory School, Secret Army groups and railway workers, under the command of Henri Girousse. It resulted in the destruction or immobilization of 52 locomotives, three roundhouses, and a maintenance workshop with its machine tools. (Note: p. 108.) Only one injured was to be deplored. There were no reprisals, the Germans having imagined that the perpetrators were paratroopers.

From 8 June 1944, railway track sabotages took place every night for twelve days. The priority axes were those linking Ambérieu-en-Bugey to Culoz then Modane, Strasbourg to Lyon and Paris to Lyon then Marseille. These hundreds of track and rolling stock sabotages took place until the liberation of the department (Note: p. 323.) with an amplification during the Allied landing in Provence where German troops sought to retreat to northeastern France.

Six troop transport trains were attacked between 6 and 16 August 1944 on the line between Coligny and Saint-Amour. Several German soldiers were killed and armored vehicles present inside the convoy were destroyed. On 18 August 1944, a metal bridge was destroyed at Vonnas on the line linking Bourg-en-Bresse to Mâcon. (Note: p. 291.)

On 14 August 1944, Henri Romans-Petit ordered all his troops "to prevent all enemy traffic on the railway lines between France and Italy.". The Ambérieu - Culoz - Chambéry, Lyon - Grenoble and Ambérieu - Bourg-en-Bresse lines were cut. Railway bridges were sometimes destroyed there.

== Organization of the camps ==
=== Geostrategic interests of the department ===
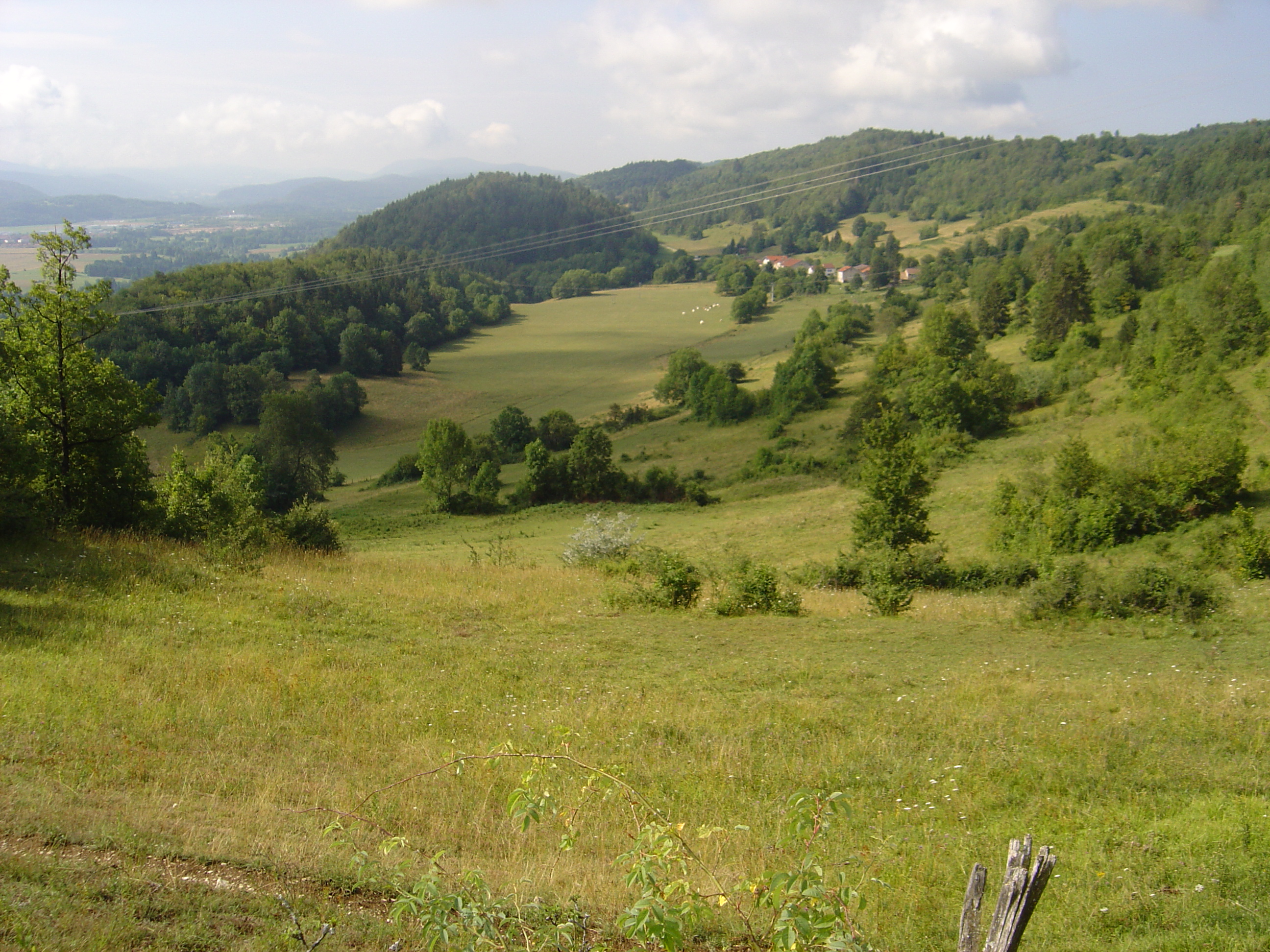
Chougeat, view of the valley.

The topographical duality of the Ain department provides two geostrategic interests for the establishment of a resistance in the form of maquis. To the west, Bresse and Dombes consist of plains and are strategic locations for conducting aerial operations by the Royal Air Force. Bugey is located in the eastern part of the Ain department between the Rhône river and the Ain river, extending in part over the southern Jura. It consists of rugged mountainous terrain, especially for the sector called Haut-Bugey, the land is covered with spruces. It contains a large number of isolated farms that maquisard groups will use for camouflage. It is terrain conducive to the practice of guerrilla warfare: from the heights, men can carry out attacks, such as machine-gunning Nazi truck columns, and the woods allow maquisard groups to have shelter and retreat in case of failure.

To the east, the department is located on the border with Switzerland allowing escape and the creation of intelligence networks. To the west, the city of Lyon, one of the hotbeds of resistance, borders the department. The Ain department is also an important railway crossroads for the mobility of German divisions:

- The SNCF depot in Ambérieu-en-Bugey, located at the foot of the Haut-Bugey mountains, has three roundhouses. 2,000 people are employed there including 1,100 railway workers;
- The Culoz depot is another strategic and vital railway center for German divisions.

These railway nodes and the proximity of the mountains make Bugey a strategic location for carrying out sabotages. The Special Operations Executive therefore has a particular interest in the region due to the war in Italy.

In February 1944, Richard Heslop finds another advantage to the establishment of maquis in Ain. Unlike Haute-Savoie, where the rugged terrain allows hiding a large number of men, but where retreat routes are rare, Ain has a large number of passable roads and thus conducive to retreats. There are also large plateaus to the west that will serve for parachute drops and he recognizes the advantage of the terrain to the east of the department for camouflage and the practice of guerrilla warfare.

=== Location of the camps ===
Nine camps are recorded at the end of 1943.

- The Chougeat camp opened in March 1943 is the oldest of them. It groups about sixty maquisards under the command of Charles Blétel;
- The Cize camp dates from June 1943. It is located at the top of a cliff near the Cize–Bolozon dam;
- The Verduraz camp is formed by Captain Henri Romans-Petit in July 1943 at the Terment farm and houses about forty-five men;
- The Morez camp, created by Pierre Marcault, has about forty men at its creation around the middle of August 1943 in the south region of Bellegarde on the Hotonnes plateau. The consequent increase in the number of its members requires the opening of the Combettes camp located about one kilometer east of the latter;
- The Combettes camp has about fifty people of relatively different geographical origins;
- The Granges camp is created in September 1943. Two refractory groups being under threat of repression decide to unite their forces and form this camp which will count up to seventy people;
- The Pré-carré camp is created by Jean-Pierre de Lassus Saint-Geniès in November 1943 and is located north of Hotonnes. It has about fifty people. On 12 January 1944, Jean-Pierre de Lassus hands over command of the Pré-carré camp to Lieutenant Paul de Vanssay, escaped from Germany. From this date, Paul de Vanssay also controls the Combettes camps and the Morez farm;
- The Pray-Guy farm camp in Brénod is created by Georges Bena in November 1943. It stands out for having hosted up to eighty men while showing very great discipline;
- The Rolland camp is the last formed.

According to studies from the maquisard strength ledger under the command of Captain Henri Romans-Petit, 454 men are recorded at the beginning of January 1944. However, the man in charge of establishing this ledger, Marius Roche estimates, based on figures transmitted by Owen Denis Johnson to London, that the real figure is 485 maquisards.

=== Life in the camps ===
Supply is an important point in camp life. The men obtain supplies in the surrounding villages thanks to donations from villagers. However, the quantity is insufficient and it is often salted beef — which can be kept for a month — lentils, potatoes and bread. Movements take place at night for greater discretion.

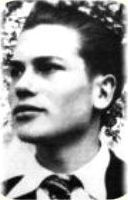
Charles Blétel, leader of the Cize camp.

=== Population of the maquis ===
During 1943, a ledger of camp strengths was drawn up. It provides an overview of the maquisard population during this period.

On 1 January 1944, 454 names are recorded. However, according to Marius Roche, there is a margin of error allowing the real strength to be set at 485 people. They are placed under the orders of Colonel Henri Romans-Petit and distributed between the camps of the northern and southern groups. 323 people form the southern group.

Of this population: 49% come from the Ain department, 38% come from elsewhere in France including 19% from the occupied zone, and 13% are foreigners. The foreigners come from Yugoslavia (14), Poland (12), Italy (11), Spain (7), Russia (4), Belgium (4) and Switzerland (1). The Yugoslavs, Poles and Russians are deserters from the Wehrmacht. The Italians and Spaniards are political refugees who fled the regimes of Benito Mussolini and Francisco Franco. This share of foreigners is twice as high as the national average of other maquis (6%). A downed Canadian aviator is also part of the group from winter 1943 until summer 1944.

Age classes range from 16 to 55 years; a majority of maquisards, 86%, are under 24 years old. 52% of the strength are young people born between 1920 and 1922 who refused forced sending to the Service du travail obligatoire. But not all STO refractories join the maquis: a study of the Registre des insoumis, défaillants et réfractaires conducted by Yves Martin shows that between 3 September 1943 and 26 December 1943, 1,301 young people — born between 1920 and 1922 — out of 1891 did not respond to their summons.

=== Evolution of the maquisards ===
The southern group brings together the Combettes, Morez, Pré Carré (Lorraine), Corlier, Richard camps, the transport group and the command post. The strength ledger has more details for these camps and allows knowing the evolution of the camps by arrival date of the 323 men who arrived there.

During 1943 arrivals amplified. In the southern group, 22 maquisards are recorded between February and May 1943, then 89 more between June and August 1943. The majority of arrivals (57.6% of the strength) occurred between September and November 1943, or 186 people. This amplification of arrivals is explained in part by the 11 November 1943 parade in Oyonnax but also by the harshness of winter and spring in the department which, combined with lack of means, does not encourage people to join the maquis.

Until liberation, the number of maquisards grows. In June 1944, it is estimated at 4,561 people for the camps of the southern and northern groups and 2,645 people for the eastern groups, which are located in Bresse and Dombes. In total, in June 1944, 7,206 people are available to fight against the German occupier. (Note: p. 213.)

== Memorial sites ==
=== Monuments and steles ===
Numerous war memorials and steles have been erected in homage to the maquis of Ain and Haut-Jura. Major monuments pay tribute to all the maquisards, resistants and people who contributed to the liberation of the department:

- the main one is the Maquis of Ain and Resistance Memorial located in the commune of Cerdon. Its construction was decided by the Association of Former Maquis of Ain presided over by Colonel Henri Romans-Petit and began on 26 June 1949 for an inauguration on 29 July 1951. It is financed by the French State, the Ain department and private donations. The body of an unknown maquisard is buried there during a ceremony presided over by Gaston Monnerville on 20 May 1954 then a cemetery bringing together 89 maquisards and victims of the Holocaust is subsequently created then inaugurated on 24 June 1956 by Charles de Gaulle. The quotation "Où je meurs renaît la Patrie" [Where I die the Fatherland is reborn], from the last verse of La Chanson du franc-tireur by Louis Aragon, is engraved on the monument;
- another major monument homage to the maquis is created in Ain. It is inaugurated in Hotonnes, more precisely at Plans d'Hotonnes in 2001 and is named Une porte ouverte sur le Maquis. This monument is also dedicated to the populations of Hotonnes and Valromey;
- at Col de la Lèbe, a monument is dedicated to the maquisards of Bugey;
- in Hauteville-Lompnes, a monument is dedicated to the resistants of the Hauteville plateau;
- in Châtillon-sur-Chalaronne stands the monument to the Dombes resistants.
- in Montanges, on the D 14 stands the monument dedicated to the combat of 8 April 1944, during which Paul de Vanssay and 17 of his companions were killed. A white cross located below on the Labâtie plateau marks the exact spot where Paul de Vanssay fell.

Monuments are dedicated to the various combats fought by the maquisards:

- for the combat of 2 February 1944 which led to the death of seven men, a stele is erected in Ruffieu;
- for the German attack of 5 February 1944 which caused the loss of three maquisards. A stele is implanted in Hauteville-Lompnes at the place called Le Rut. It is named the "stele of the combat of the Marco franc group of February 5, 1944". Another is located in Brénod at the place called Monthoux

A stele recalls the memory and the place where a maquisard was shot by the Germans in Dompierre-sur-Veyle.

- for the combat of 8 February 1944 during which ten maquisards and a farmer were killed, two monuments are created. They are located in L'Abergement-de-Varey and on the site of the La Montagne farm.
- Steles are erected in homage to personalities of the maquis and on the sites of camp establishments: one of them honors the memory of a maquis pioneer Marius Chavant, killed in 1944. It is located in Montgriffon in the commune of Aranc;
- a stele located in Corveissiat at the place called Chalour marks the location of the Cize camp, and pays homage to the 58 dead of summer 1943;
- the location of the cadre school, in Aranc, at the place called des Gorges, is marked by the stele of the 1st command post of Romans.

Other steles pay homage to the allies of the maquis of Ain and Haut-Jura.

- The Allied Wings Monument is inaugurated in 1989 in the meadow of Échallon. It symbolizes the aid provided by the allies during the conflict. The ashes of Richard Heslop, Denis Johnson, Raymond Aubin and Marcel Veilleux are preserved there.
- In Izernore, a monument pays homage to the United States Army Air Forces. It is located on the ground where the first landing in occupied France of an Allied plane took place in the night of 6 to 7 July 1944.
- Monuments are dedicated to the Royal Air Force: in Saint-Vulbas, in Manziat on the Aigle ground and in the village, in Ambérieu-en-Bugey, in Hauteville-Lompnes, in Saint-Jean-le-Vieux, in Sermoyer, in Bletterans.
- Other steles are dedicated:
  - to the United Forces of Patriotic Youth in Villieu, in Meximieux, in Hauteville-Lompnes;
  - to the Secret Army in Neuville-sur-Ain;
  - to the military school children of the Autun military school in Neuville-sur-Ain and at the La Valbonne military camp;
  - to the Résistance-Fer of Ambérieu-en-Bugey.

World War II memorials are located in the majority of the department's communes.

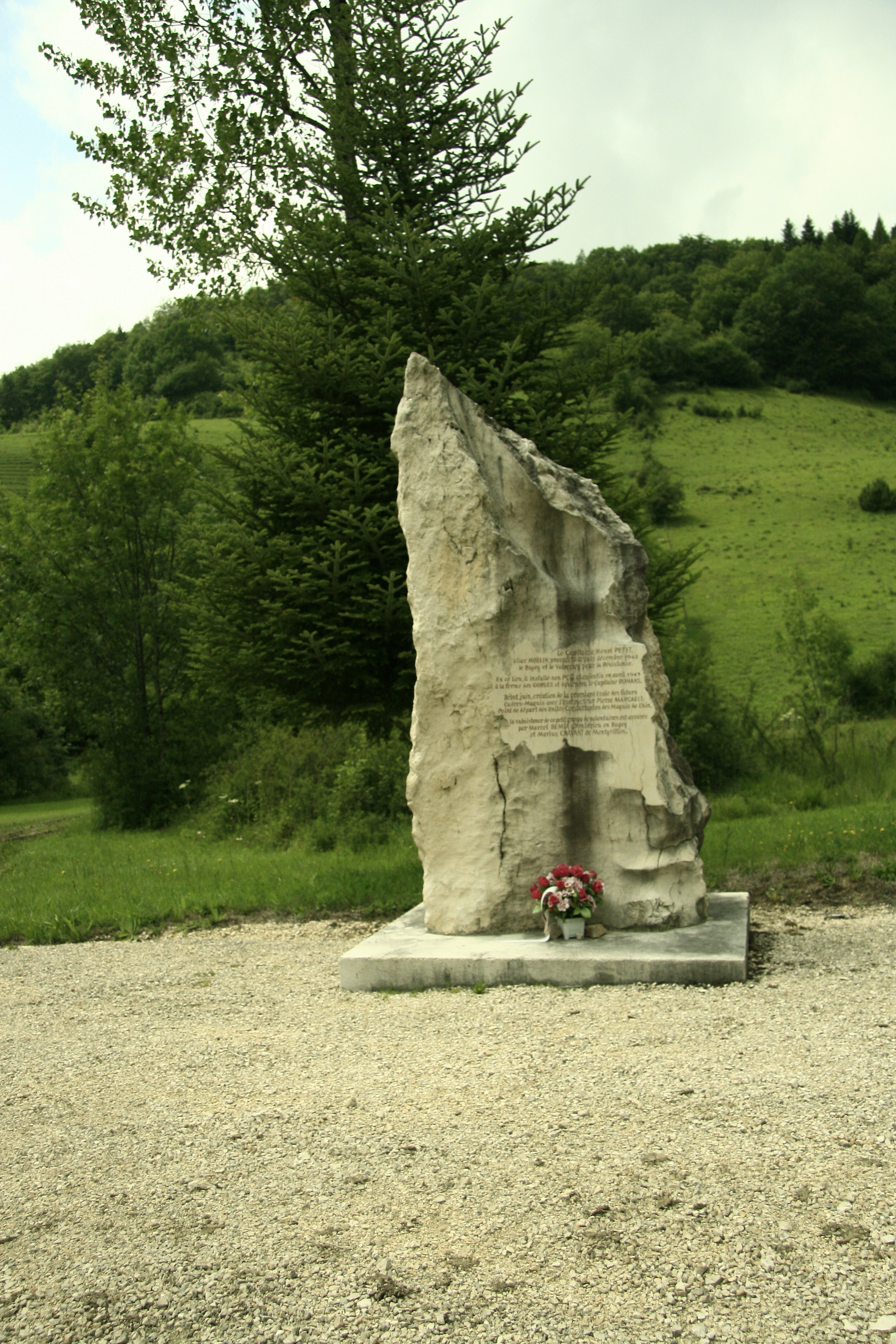
Commemorative stele of the Ain maquis in Aranc, at the place called Colognat.

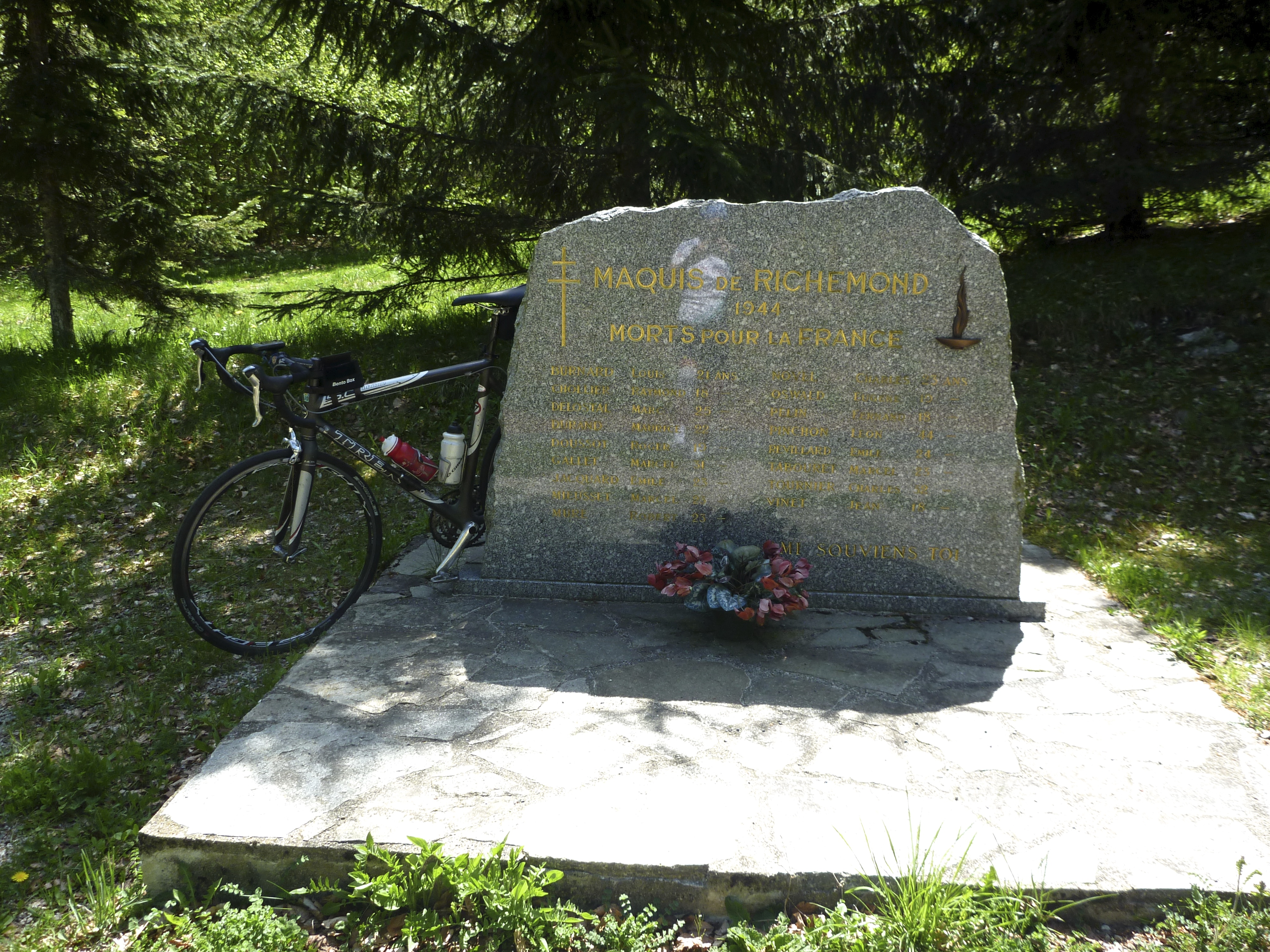
The maquis monument at Col de Richemond.

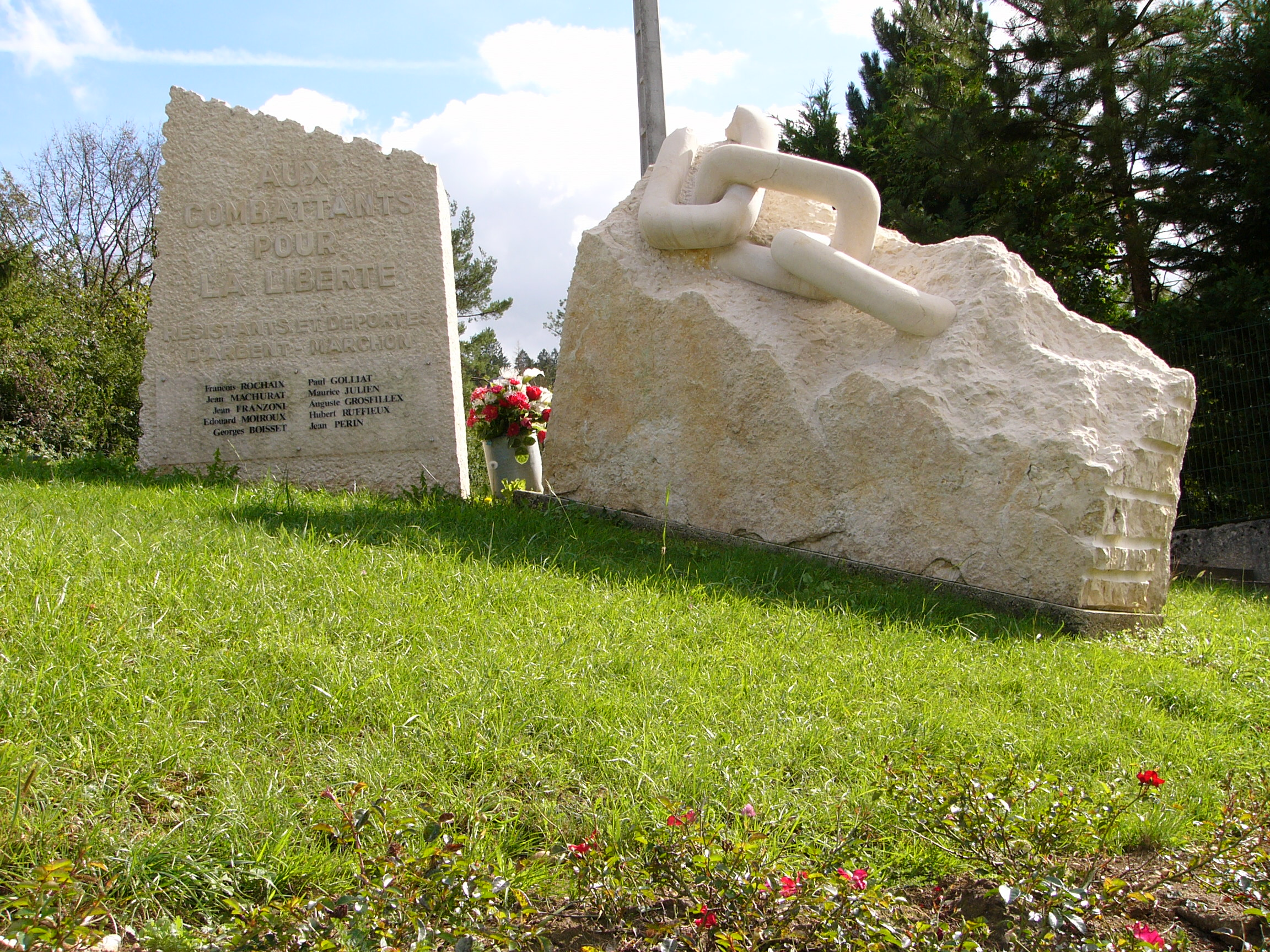
Maquis monument in Arbent.

=== Martyred villages ===
In reprisal for the actions of the Resistance, German troops frequently attacked civilian populations, burning villages and targeting inhabitants. The villages of Ugna, Lavancia, as well as small hamlets were destroyed. During July 1944, Dortan was the scene of a massacre and was entirely burned. The town was rebuilt as a "martyred city" to house the inhabitants and businesses.

Plaques and steles were erected in the martyred villages burned in July 1944. They are located in Cerdon, Chavannes-sur-Suran, Dortan, Chevignat, Coligny, Verjon, Pressiat, Salavre, Courmangoux, Roissiat, Cuisiat.

=== Museums ===
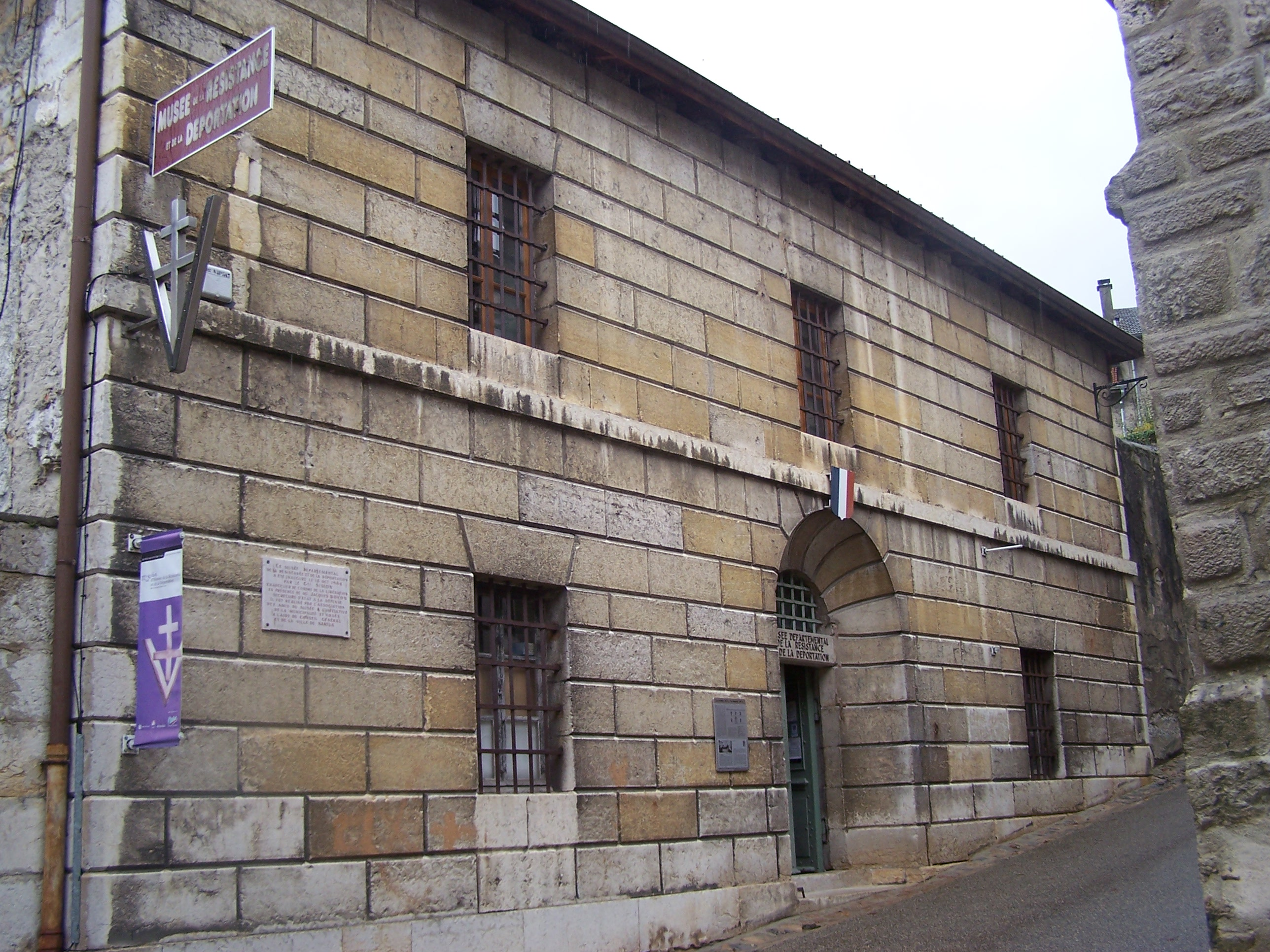
Facade of the Museum of the History of Resistance and Deportation of Ain and Haut-Jura.

The Departmental Museum of the History of Resistance and Deportation of Ain and Haut-Jura is a museum located in Nantua whose theme is France during World War II and more specifically the history of the Resistance and maquis of the region. It was inaugurated on 12 August 1986 and was visited by more than 9,800 visitors in 2008. It has more than 15,000 objects.

== See also ==
- French Resistance
- Maquis des Glières

== Bibliography ==
- Louis Saurel (1945). Le maquis de l'Ain [The Maquis of the Ain] (in French). Paris: Fernand Nathan.
- Yves Martin (1987). La formation des maquis de l'Ain : décembre 1942 - février 1944 [The formation of the Ain maquis: December 1942 - February 1944] (in French). Lyon: AAMA.
- Édouard Croisy (1997). Vie et combats d'un maquis de l'Ain-Jura : 1943-1944 [Life and struggles of a resistance group in the Ain-Jura region: 1943-1944] (in French). Paris: Artis. ISBN 978-2-912577-00-9.
- Pierre-G. Jeanjacquot (1997). Les vagabonds de l'honneur [The vagabonds of honor] (in French). Groupement des amicales de maquisards et résistants Ain-Haut-Jura.
- Patrick Veyret (1999). Histoire de la Résistance armée dans l'Ain : enjeux stratégiques et services secrets [History of the Armed Resistance in the Ain: Strategic Issues and Secret Services] (in French). Châtillon-sur-Chalaronne: La Taillanderie. ISBN 978-2-87629-196-6.
- Patrick Veyret (2005). Une porte ouverte sur le maquis de l'Ain [A gateway to the Ain maquis] (in French). Châtillon-sur-Chalaronne: La Taillanderie. ISBN 2-87629-279-3.
- Patrick Veyret (2010). Histoire secrète des Maquis de l'Ain : Acteurs et enjeux [The Secret History of the Ain Maquis: Key Players and Issues at Stake] (in French). Châtillon-sur-Chalaronne: La Taillanderie. ISBN 978-2-87629-325-0.
- Gilbert Collet (2011). Histoire de la Déportation et de la Résistance à Oyonnax et sa région : Auschwitz - Mauthausen - Buchenwald - Neuengamme - Ravensbrück - Le Struthof [History of Deportation and Resistance in Oyonnax and its region: Auschwitz - Mauthausen - Buchenwald - Neuengamme - Ravensbrück - Le Struthof] (in French). Oyonnax: G. Collet. ISBN 978-2-7466-3317-9.
- Jacqueline Di Carlo (1994). La Guerre de 1939-1940 dans le canton de Saint-Rambert-en-Bugey [The War of 1939-1940 in the canton of Saint-Rambert-en-Bugey] (in French). District de la vallée de l'Albarine. ISBN 2-907881-12-4.
- Henri Romans-Petit (1974). Les Maquis de l'Ain [The Maquis of the Ain]. La Libération de la France (in French). Paris: Hachette. ISBN 2-01-000597-X.
