= Canton of Brénod =

Coordinates: 46°03′41″N 5°36′22″E

Brénod
- Former canton
- Interactive map of Brénod
- Country: France
- Region: Auvergne-Rhône-Alpes
- Department: Ain
- No. of communes: {{{nbcomm}}}
- Disbanded: 2015
- Area: 203.17 km^{2} (78.44 sq mi)
- Population (2012): 3,746
  - Density: 18.44/km^{2} (47.75/sq mi)

The canton of Brénod is an administrative division in eastern France. It was disbanded following the French canton reorganisation which came into effect in March 2015. It consisted of 12 communes, which joined the canton of Plateau d'Hauteville in 2015. It had 3,746 inhabitants (2012).

The canton comprised 12 communes:

- Brénod
- Champdor
- Chevillard
- Condamine
- Corcelles
- Le Grand-Abergement
- Hotonnes
- Izenave
- Lantenay
- Outriaz
- Le Petit-Abergement
- Vieu-d'Izenave

== Demographics ==
Historical population Canton of Brénod
Year	1962	1968	1975	1982	1990	1999
Pop.	2,634	2,971	2,661	2,873	3,105	3,241
±%	—	+12.8%	−10.4%	+8.0%	+8.1%	+4.4%
From the year 1962 on: No double counting – residents of multiple communes (e.g. students and military personnel) are counted only once. Source: INSEE

== See also ==
- Cantons of the Ain department
- Communes of France
