= Apremont =

Apremont is the name or part of the name of several communities:

== France ==
- Apremont, Ain, in the Ain département
- Apremont, Ardennes, in the Ardennes département
- Apremont, Oise, in the Oise département
- Apremont, Haute-Saône, in the Haute-Saône département
- Apremont, Savoie, in the Savoie département
- Apremont, Vendée, in the Vendée département
- Apremont-la-Forêt, in the Meuse département
- Apremont-sur-Allier, in the Cher département

== United States ==
- Apremont Triangle Historic District in Springfield, Massachusetts

== See also ==
- Aspremont (disambiguation)
