= Lantenay =

Lantenay may refer to:

- Lantenay, Ain
- Lantenay, Côte-d'Or
