= Condamine =

Condamine may refer to any of the following:

== Places ==
=== Australia ===
- Condamine River in Queensland
- Condamine, Queensland, a town on the Condamine River
- Electoral district of Condamine, Queensland, named after the river

=== France ===
Condamine is the name of several communes in France:

- Condamine, in the Ain département
- Condamine, in the Jura département
- La Condamine-Châtelard, in the Alpes-de-Haute-Provence département

=== Monaco ===
- La Condamine, a quartier (ward) of Monaco

== People ==
- Charles Marie de La Condamine (1701-1774), French explorer, geographer and mathematician.
- Robert "Robin" de la Condamine (1877-1966), British actor who used the stage name Robert Farquharson.

== In arts ==
Condamine is also a fictional drug in the Instrumentality of Mankind universe of science-fiction author Cordwainer Smith.
