= Armix =

Commune in Auvergne-Rhône-Alpes, France

- Commune
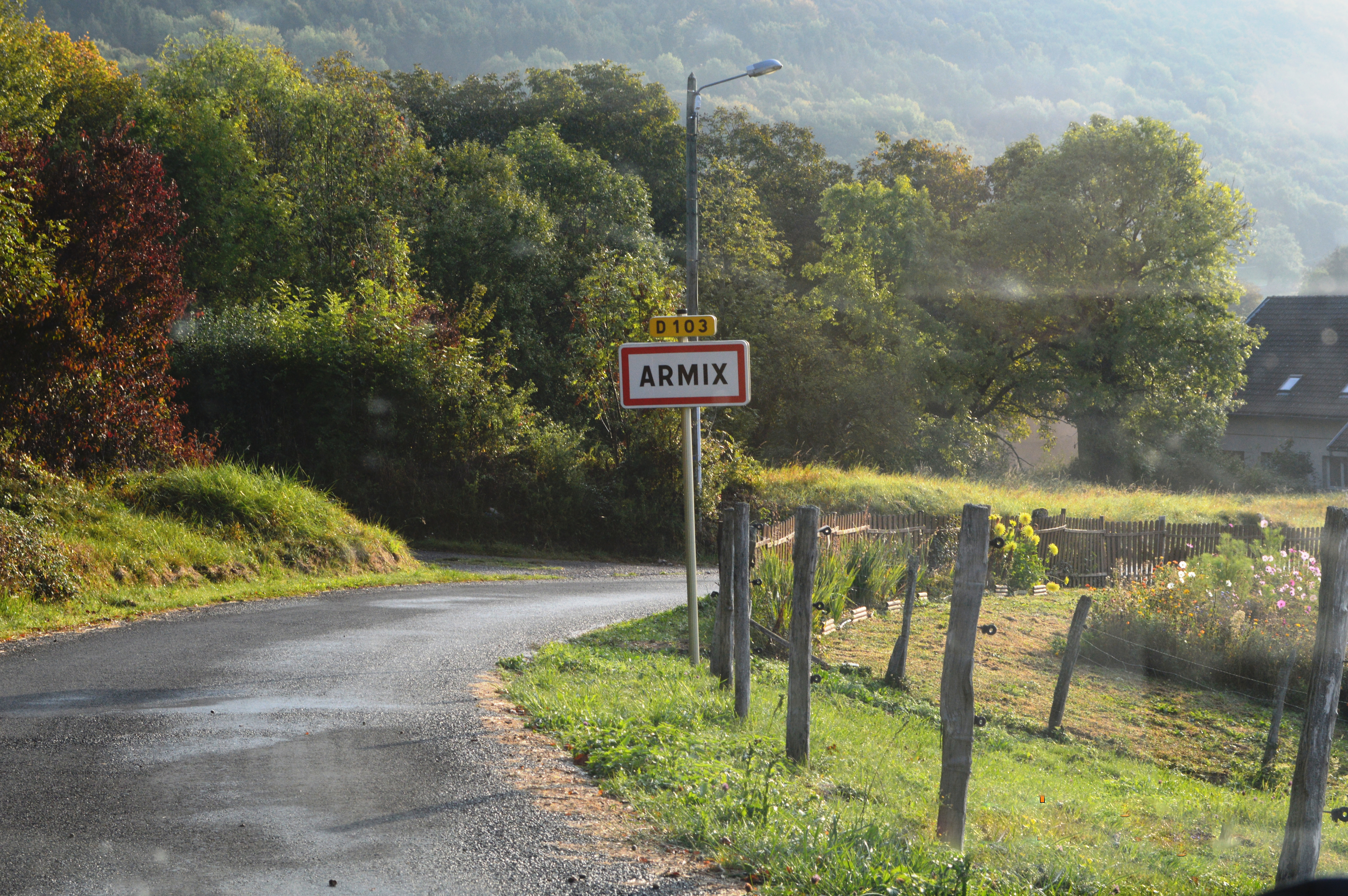
- Location of Armix
- Location within France Location within Auvergne-Rhône-Alpes
- Coordinates: 45°51′00″N 5°35′11″E
- Country: France
- Region: Auvergne-Rhône-Alpes
- Department: Ain
- Arrondissement: Belley
- Canton: Plateau d'Hauteville
- Intercommunality: Bugey Sud

Government
  - Mayor (2026–32): Véronique Vuilloud
- Area^{1}: 6.82 km^{2} (2.63 sq mi)
- Elevation: 720 m (2,360 ft)
- Highest elevation: 1,064 m (3,491 ft)
- Lowest elevation: 420 m (1,380 ft)
- Population (2023): 25
  - Density: 3.7/km^{2} (9.5/sq mi)
- Time zone: UTC+01:00 (CET)
  - Summer (DST): UTC+02:00 (CEST)
- INSEE/Postal code: 01019 /01510
- ^{1} French Land Register data, which excludes lakes, ponds, glaciers > 1 km^{2} (0.386 sq mi or 247 acres) and river estuaries.

Armix is a commune in the Ain department in the Auvergne-Rhône-Alpes region of eastern France.

== Geography ==
Armix is located some 30 km south-east of Amberieu-en-Bugey and 40 km north-west of Aix-les-Bains. It can be accessed by road D103 from Rossillon in the south passing through the village and continuing north to Premillieu. There are few small mountain roads in the commune which is entirely mountainous and mostly forested.

The Ruisseau Pointay rises near the village and flows south joining the Ruisseau de la Chana which forms part of the southern border and continues south-west to join the Furans river.

== Administration ==
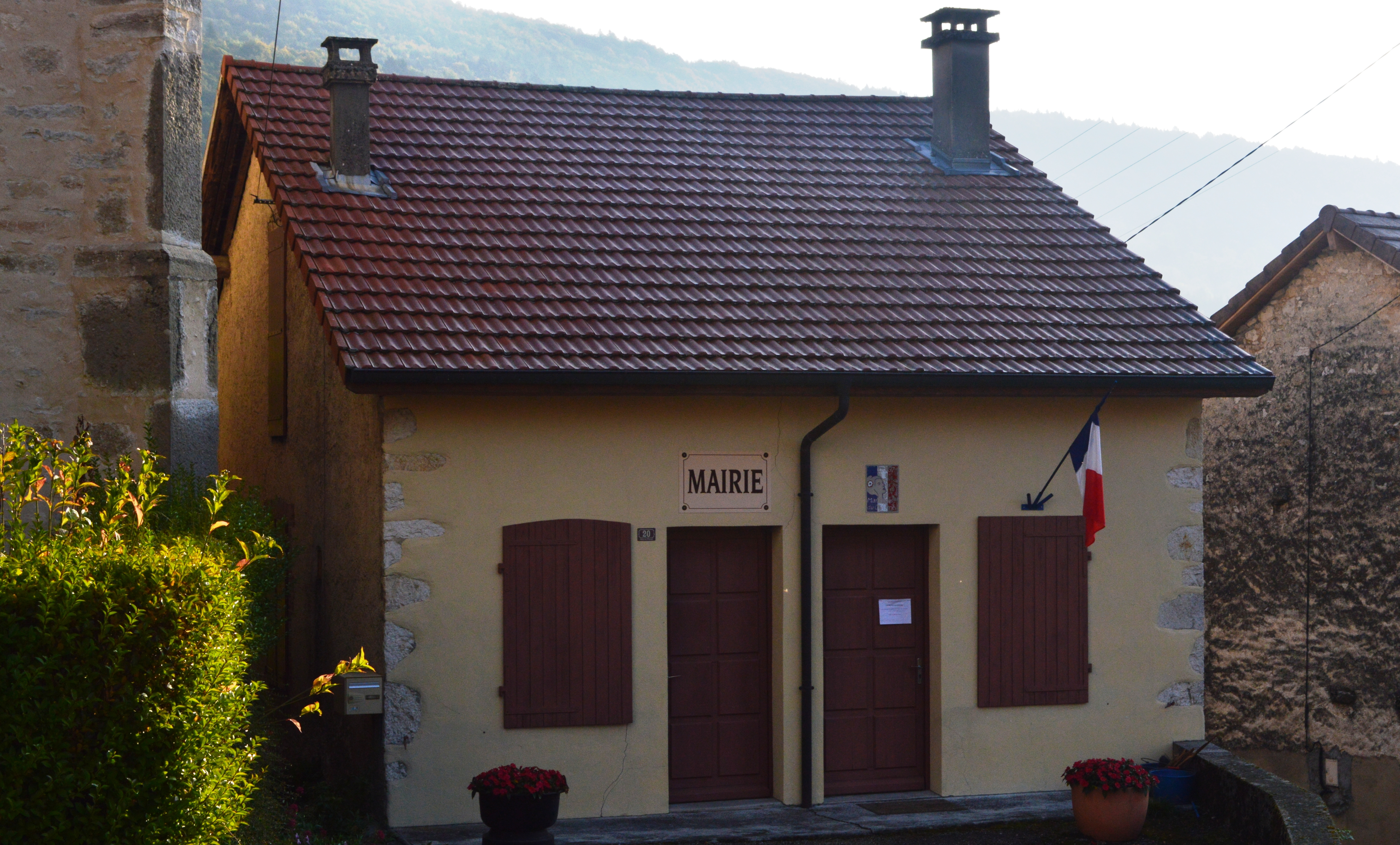
The Town Hall

List of mayors of Armix

From	To	Name
1995	2001	Georges Galley
2001	2008	Michel Miguet
2008	2014	Gérard Billon-Grand
2014	Present	Véronique Vuilloud

== Economy ==
The Economy of the commune of Armix is mostly Agriculture. The commune of Armix is located in the Rhone-Alpes, region in the department of Ain. The economy of the Rhone-Alpes region is based on raw materials, agriculture and energy.

== Population ==
Historical population
Year	Pop.	±% p.a.
1968	48	—
1975	33	−5.21%
1982	28	−2.32%
1990	14	−8.30%
1999	15	+0.77%
2007	25	+6.59%
2012	20	−4.36%
2017	28	+6.96%
2023	25	−1.87%
Source: INSEE

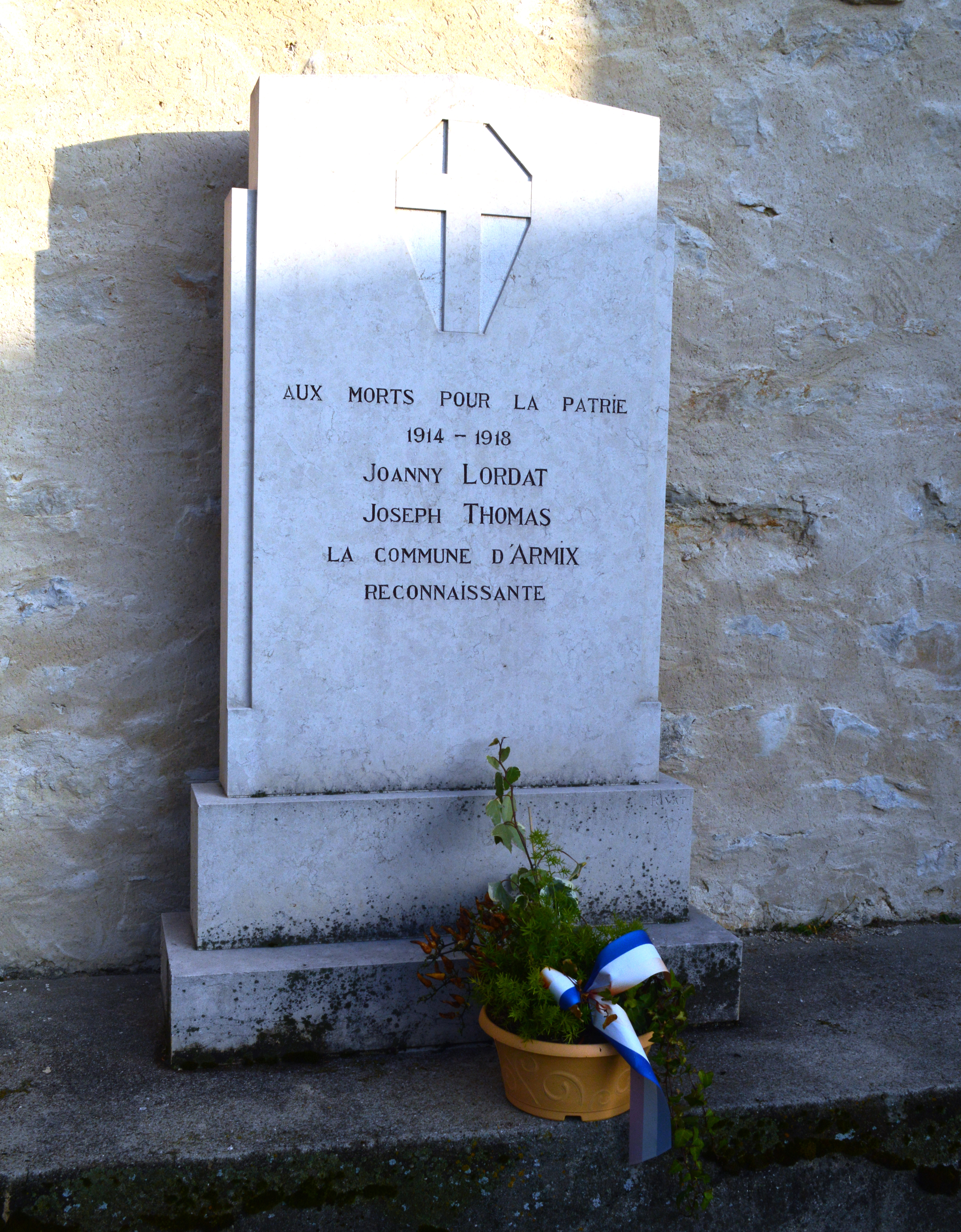
Armix War Memorial

== Armix Photo Gallery ==
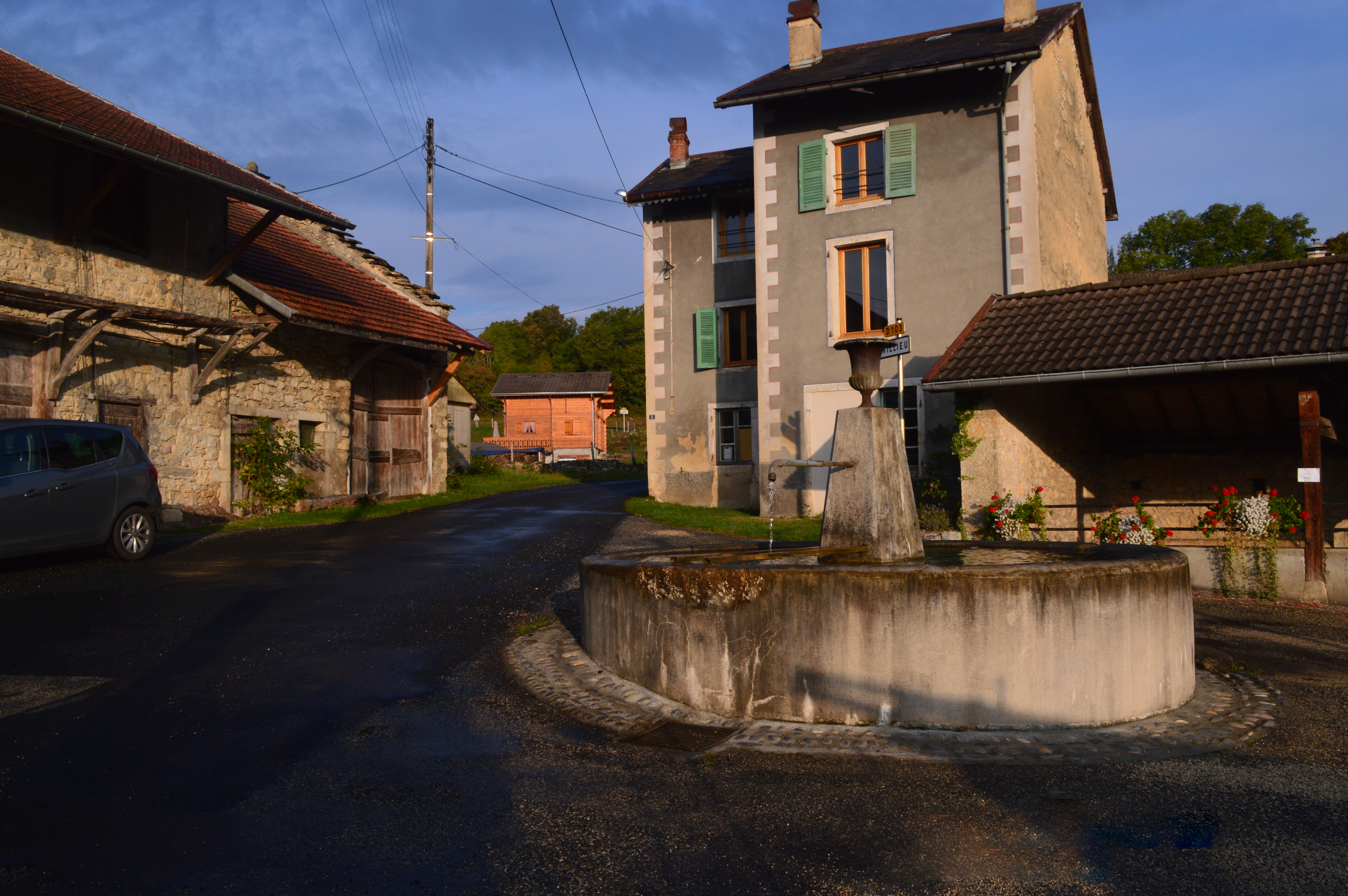
Armix Town Square

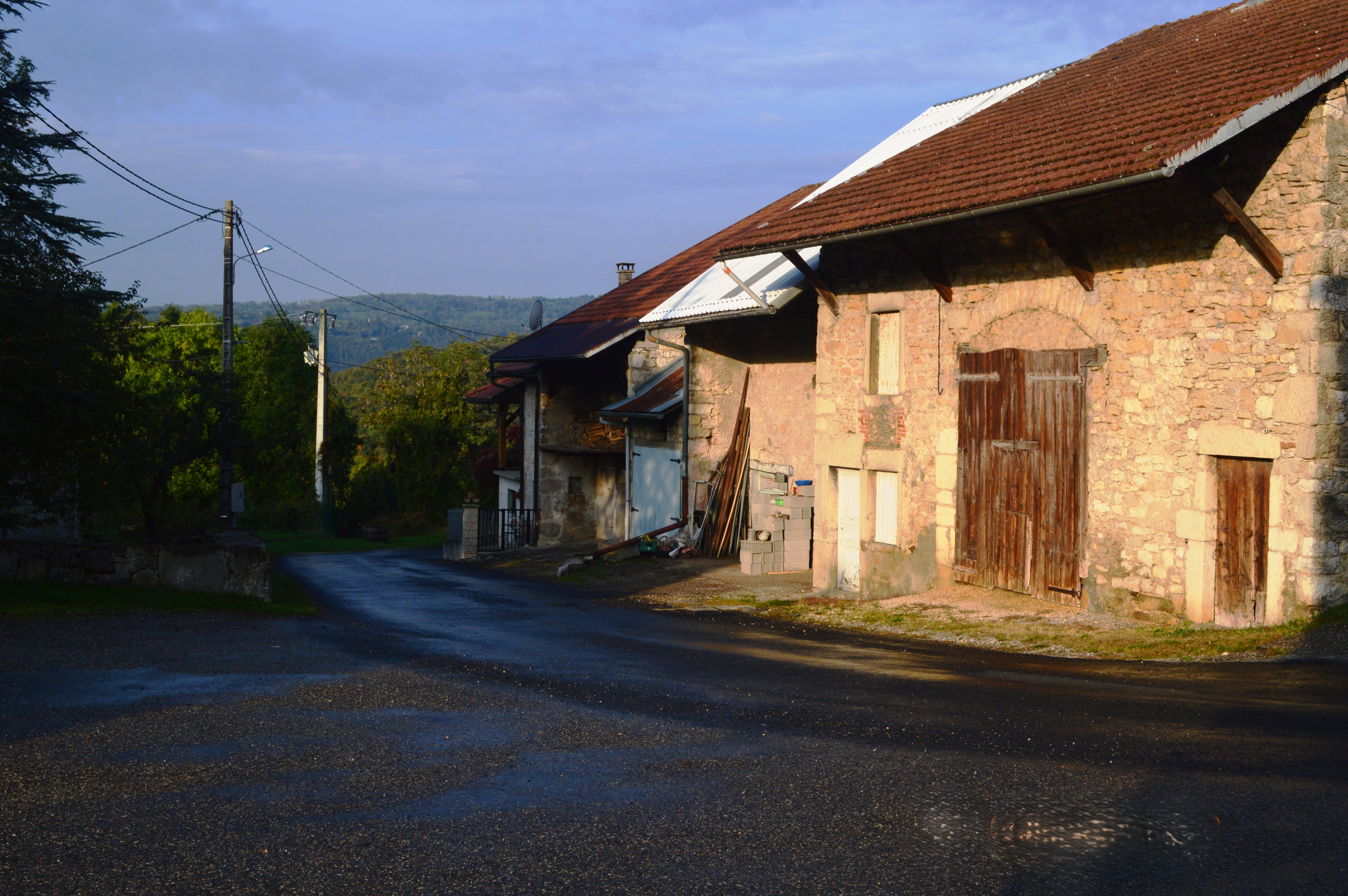
A street in Armix

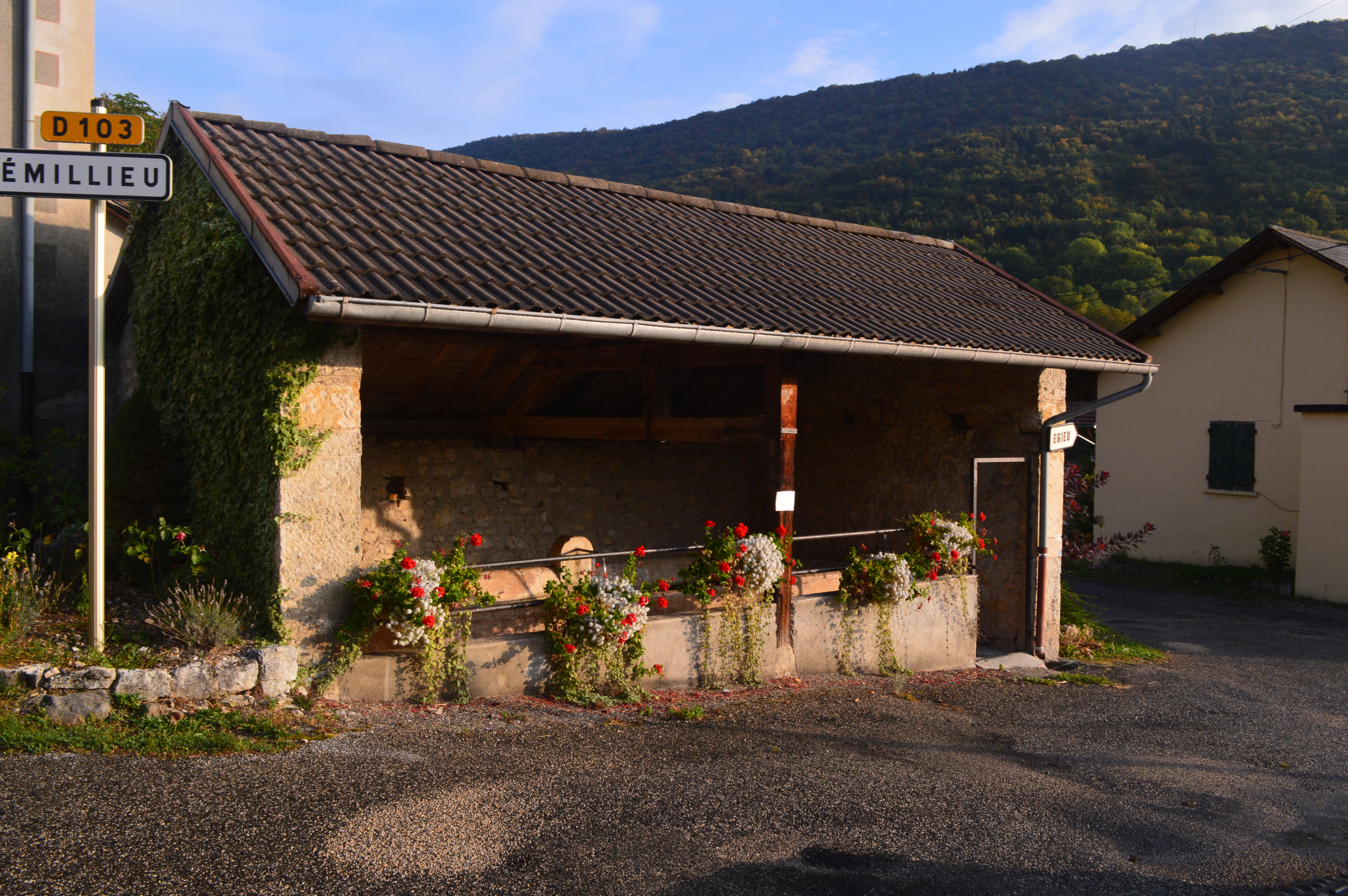
Armix Lavoir (Public Laundry)

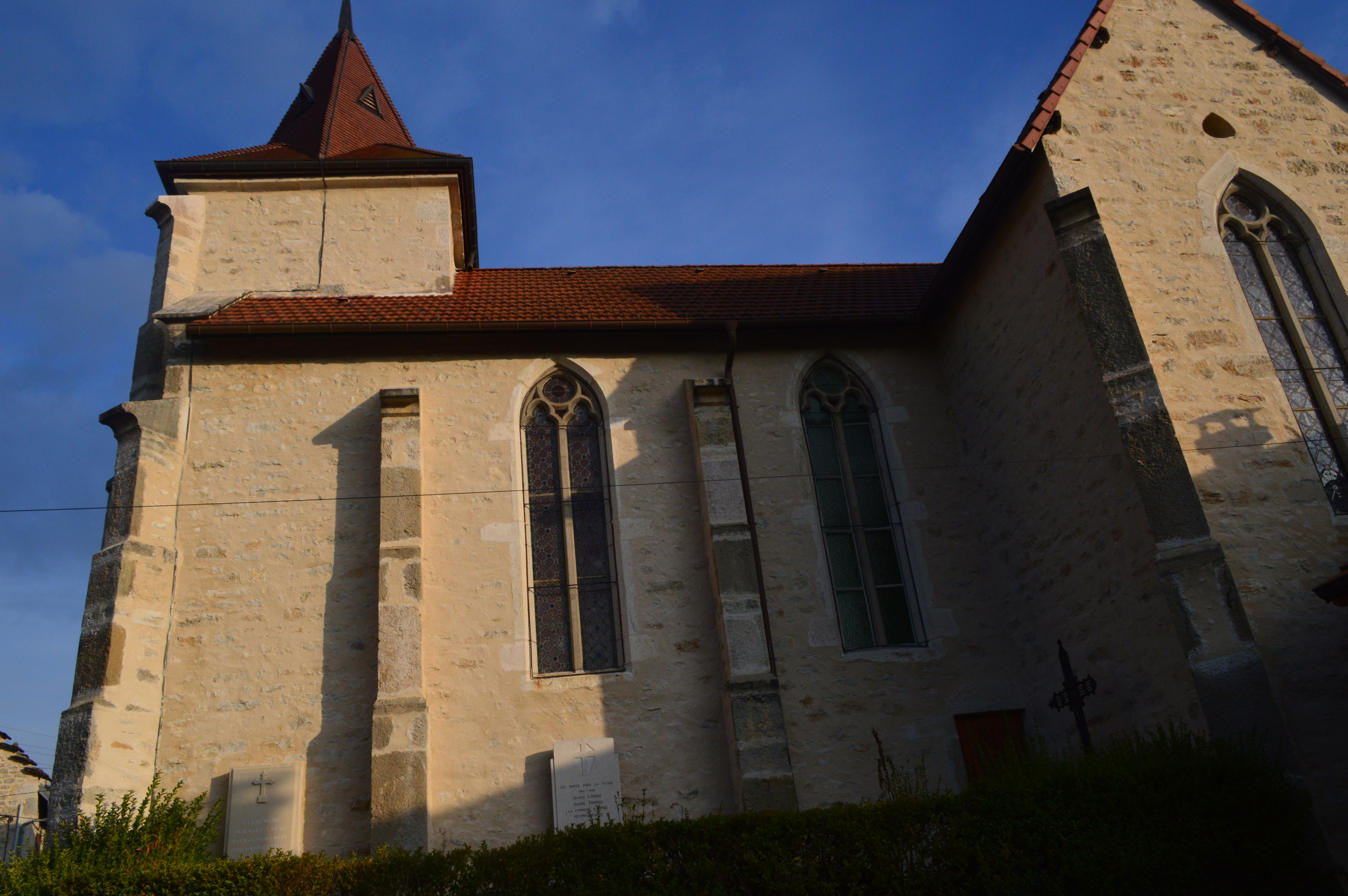
Armix Church

== See also ==
- Communes of the Ain department
