= Martignat station =

Railway station in Martignat, France

Martignat

General information
- Location: Martignat; Ain; France
- Owner: SNCF
- Line: Andelot-en-Montagne—La Cluse railway
- Distance: 110.406 km

History
- Closed: Closed
Location

Martignat station (French: Gare de Martignat) was a French railway station located in the commune of Martignat, Ain department in the Auvergne-Rhône-Alpes region. The station was located at kilometric point 110.406 on the Andelot-en-Montagne—La Cluse railway.

As of 2021, the station is closed by the SNCF and lacks any passenger or freight services. The TER Auvergne-Rhône-Alpes network does however offer replacement bus services between Bourg-en-Bresse and Oyannax.

== History ==
The section of railway between Oyonnax and La Cluse was opened on 16 May 1885 by the Compagnie des chemins de fer de Paris à Lyon et à la Méditerranée. The station was sold to the SNCF, as part of the nationalization of the railway in 1938.
