= Jacques Julliard =

French writer and historian (1933–2023)

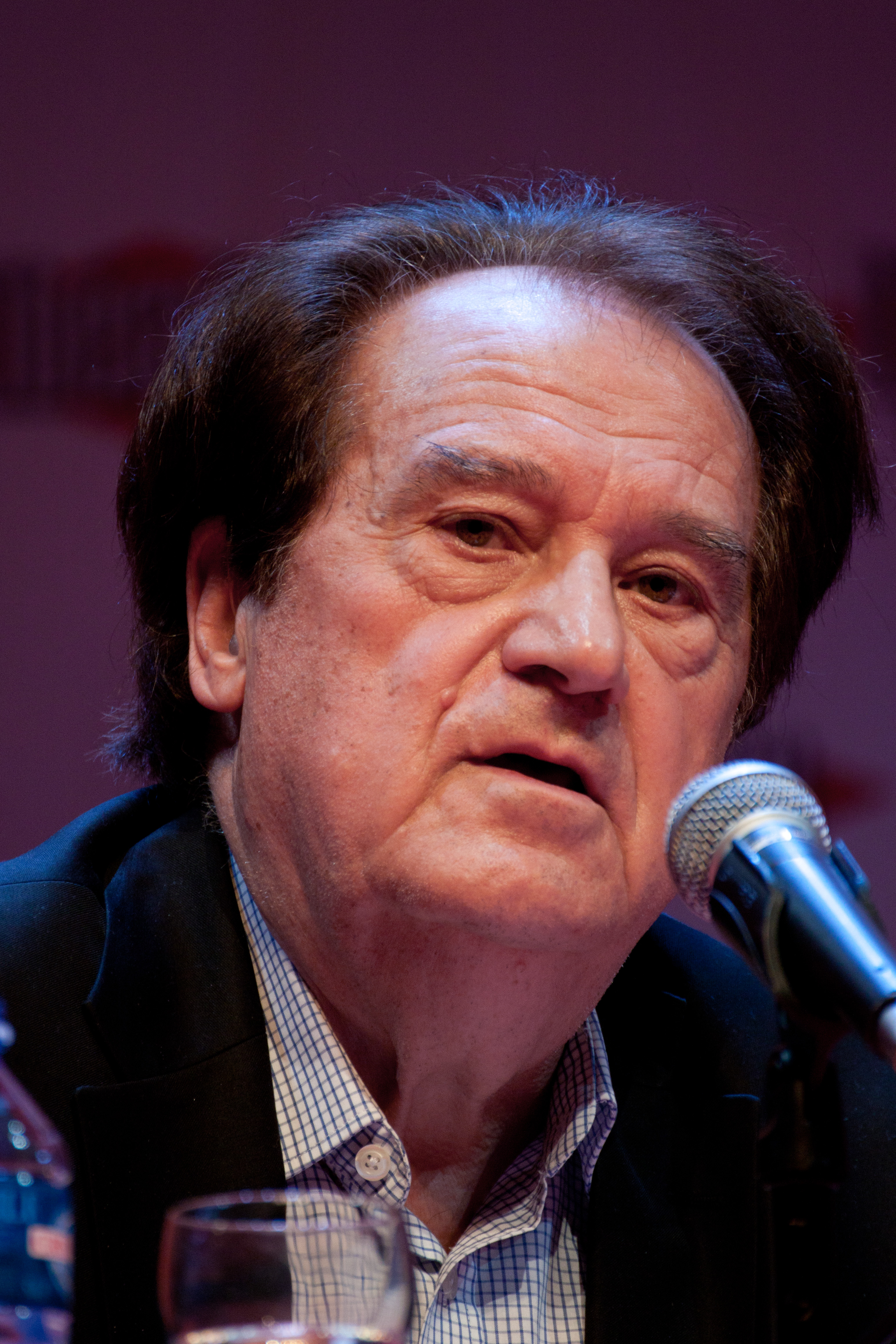
- Julliard in 2012
- Born: Jacques Marius Frédéric Julliard; 4 March 1933; Brénod, Ain, France
- Died: 8 September 2023 (aged 90); Antony, France
- Education: Lycée du Parc
- Alma mater: École Normale Supérieure
- Occupations: Journalist and essayist
- Employer(s): Le Nouvel Obs; Marianne; Le Figaro
- Spouse: Suzanne Julliard
- Children: 3

Jacques Julliard (4 March 1933 – 8 September 2023) was a French historian, columnist and essayist, and a union leader. He was the author of numerous books.

== Life ==
=== Early years ===
Jacques Julliard was born on 4 March 1933 in Brénod, Ain. His father and grandfather had both been mayors of the village where he was born.

Julliard prepared (khâgne) for entrance to an École normale supérieure at the Lycée du Parc in Lyon, where he was influenced by two teachers close to Emmanuel Mounier. He was admitted to the École normale supérieure in 1954 to study German, but changed over to history. Julliard passed his agrégation (teaching qualification) and after military service in Algeria became a secondary school teacher.

=== Union leader ===
Julliard was vice president of National Union of Students of France (UNEF: Union Nationale des Étudiants de France) from 1955 to 1956. From 1962 to 1970, and again from 1972 to 1977 he was a member of the national office of the General Union of National Education (SGEN: Syndicat général de l'Éducation nationale) of the French Confederation of Christian Workers (CFTC: Confédération française des travailleurs chrétiens). From 1973 to 1976 he was a member of the confederate office of the French Democratic Confederation of Labour (CFDT: Confédération française démocratique du travail).

=== Teacher ===
While active in the unions, and later as a columnist, Julliard followed a career as an academic specialising in political and social issues. He began a thesis on the trade unionist Fernand Pelloutier while contributing to the magazine Esprit. He was appointed a professor of history at the Bordeaux campus of Sciences Po in 1965. He taught at the Centre de formation des journalistes. With Jacques Ozouf he co-founded the History department at the University of Vincennes. In 1978 he was elected director of studies at the School for Advanced Studies in the Social Sciences (École des hautes études en sciences sociales).

=== Columnist ===
Pierre Andreu was a friend of Jacques Julliard and Pierre Vidal-Naquet, with whom he directed the Cahiers Georges Sorel.

In 1970 Julliard was introduced to Jean Daniel by André Gorz. Daniel offered him a position on the Nouvel Observateur, where he would remain until 2010. He was Director of Collection at the éditions du Seuil. In November 2010 Julliard left the Nouvel Observateur to become a columnist with the weekly Marianne, run by Maurice Szafran.

=== Death ===
Jacques Julliard died in Antony near Paris on 8 September 2023, at the age of 90.

== Publications ==
Publications by Jacques Julliard include:

- Jacques Julliard (1968), La IVe République (1947-1958), Paris: Calmann-Lévy, p. 379
- Jacques Julliard (1970), Pour le nouveau parti socialiste (Interview with Alain Savary), Paris: Éditions du Seuil, p. 186
- Jacques Julliard (1971), Un Socialisme du possible (interview with F. Mitterrand), Paris: Éditions du Seuil, p. 125
- Jacques Julliard (1971), Fernand Pelloutier et les origines du syndicalisme d'action directe, Paris: Éditions du Seuil, p. 559
- Jacques Julliard; Edmond Maire (1975), La C.F.D.T. :[Confédération française démocratique du travail] :d'aujourd'hui, Paris: Éditions du Seuil
- Jacques Julliard (1977), Contre la politique professionnelle, Paris: Éditions du Seuil, p. 161
- Michel Rocard (1979), Parler vrai : textes politiques, preface by Jacques Julliard, Paris: Éditions du Seuil, p. 169
- Jean-Noël Jeanneney; Jacques Julliard (1979), Le "Monde" de Beuve-Méry ou Le métier d'Alceste, Paris: Éditions du Seuil, p. 376
- Jacques Julliard (1981), La :IV :+Quatrième+ République 1947-1958 (revue et augmentée ed.), Paris: le Livre de poche, p. 351
- Jacques Julliard (1985), La Faute à Rousseau (essai sur les conséquences historiques de l'idée de souveraineté populaire), Paris: Éd. du Seuil, p. 252
- Jacques Julliard (1985), Fernand Pelloutier et les origines du syndicalisme d'action directe, Paris: Éd. du Seuil, p. 294
- Philippe Ardant; Jacques Julliard; Richard Rose (1987), Le président, Paris: Presses universitaires de France, p. 231
- François Furet; Jacques Julliard; Pierre Rosanvallon (1988), La République du centre : la fin de l'exception française, Paris: Calmann-Lévy / Fondation Saint-Simon, p. 182
- Jacques Julliard (1988), Autonomie ouvrière : études sur le syndicalisme d'action directe, Paris: Gallimard : Seuil, p. 298
- Jacques Julliard (1990), Le Génie de la liberté, Paris: Éd. du Seuil, p. 182
- Jacques Julliard (1991), Chroniques du septième jour (collection of articles from "Nouvel Observateur", 1981-1990), Paris: Éd. du Seuil, p. 375
- Jacques Julliard (1994), Ce fascisme qui vient, Paris: Éd. du Seuil, p. 201
- Claude Imbert; Jacques Julliard (1995), La droite et la gauche : qu'est-ce qui les distingue encore ?, Paris: R. Laffont : Grasset, p. 279
- Jacques Julliard (1996), Pour la Bosnie (collection of articles, mostly from "Nouvel observateur", 1991-1995), Paris: Éd. du Seuil, p. 315
- Jacques Julliard (1996), L'année des dupes, Paris: Éd. du Seuil, p. 366
- Jacques Julliard (1997), La faute aux élites, Paris: Gallimard, p. 283
- Jacques Julliard (1998), L'année des fantômes : journal 1997, Paris: B. Grasset, p. 396
- Jean Foyer, Jacques Julliard, Jean-Pierre Thiollet, Thierry Wolton (1998), La pensée unique : le vrai procès, Paris: Economica, p. 265
- Georges Bernanos (1999), La France contre les robots; suivi de Textes inédits, preface by Jacques Julliard, Paris: Librairie générale française / Jean-Loup Bernanos, p. 284
- Jacques Julliard (2003), Rupture dans la civilisation : le révélateur irakien, Paris: Gallimard, p. 83
- Benoît Chantre; Jacques Julliard (2003), Le choix de Pascal, Paris: Desclée de Brouwer, p. 323
- Florin Turcanu (2003), Mircea Eliade : le prisonnier de l'histoire, preface by Jacques Julliard, Paris: Éd. la Découverte, p. 539
- Mauriac-Claudel : le désir et l'infini, preface by Jacques Julliard, Paris, Torino, Budapest: l'Harmattan / Jean-François Durand, 2003, p. 304
- Jacques Julliard (2004), Que sont les grands hommes devenus ? (essai sur la démocratie charismatique), Paris: Saint-Simon : "Politique internationale", p. 160, ISBN 978-2262033415
- Jacques Julliard (2005), Le malheur français, Paris: Flammarion, p. 140
- Jacques Julliard (2007), La reine du monde (essai sur la démocratie d'opinion), Paris: Flammarion, p. 125
- Benoît Chantre; Jacques Julliard (2008), Le choix de Pascal : entretiens avec Benoît Chantre (Nouvelle revue et actualisée ed.), Paris: Flammarion, p. 330
- Jacques Julliard (2008), L'argent, Dieu et le Diable : face au monde moderne avec Péguy, Bernanos, Claudel, Paris: Flammarion, p. 229
- Jacques Julliard (2012), Les gauches françaises : histoire, politique et imaginaire, 1762-2012, Paris: Flammarion, p. 942
- Jacques Julliard (2013), Les gauches françaises, 1762-2012, vol. 1 Histoire et politique (Nouvelle ed.), Paris: Flammarion, p. 904
- Jacques Julliard (2014), Le choc Simone Weil, Paris: Flammarion, p. 133
- Grégoire Franconie; Jacques Julliard (2014), Les gauches françaises, 1762-2012, vol. 2, Paris: Flammarion, p. 815
- Jacques Julliard; Jean-Claude Michéa (2014), La gauche et le peuple : lettres croisées, Paris: Flammarion, p. 317, ISBN 978-2-08-131313-2
- Jean d' Ormesson (2015), Dieu, les affaires et nous : chronique d'un demi-siècle (collection of articles from "Le Figaro" and "Figaro magazine", 1981-2014), preface by Jacques Julliard, Paris: Robert Laffont, p. 667
- Jacques Julliard (2015), L'école est finie, Paris: Flammarion, p. 126, ISBN 978-2-0813-7896-4
- Jean d' Ormesson (2015), Dieu, les affaires et nous : chronique d'un demi-siècle (collection of articles from "Le Figaro" and "Figaro magazine", 1981-2014), preface by Jacques Julliard, Paris: le Grand livre du mois, p. 667
- Jean d' Ormesson (2016), Réflexions sur la violence (1908) (Apologie de la violence prolétarienne), preface by Jacques Julliard, Paris: Pocket, p. 846

== Sources ==
- "Andreu, Pierre (1909-1987)", IMEC (in French), IMEC: Institut Mémoires de l’édition contemporaine, 18 April 2010
- Jacques Julliard (in French), BnF: Bibliotheque nationale de France
- "Jacques Julliard", La Procure (in French)
- "Jacques Julliard quitte "le Nouvel Obs" pour "Marianne"", Liberation (in French), 17 November 2010, archived from the original on 23 October 2017
- "Julliard, Jacques (1933-....)", BnF: Bibliotheque nationale de France (in French)
- "JULLIARD Jacques", Maitron-en-ligne (in French), Maitron/Editions de l'Atelier
