= Apremont, Ain =

Commune in Auvergne-Rhône-Alpes, France

Apremont
- Commune
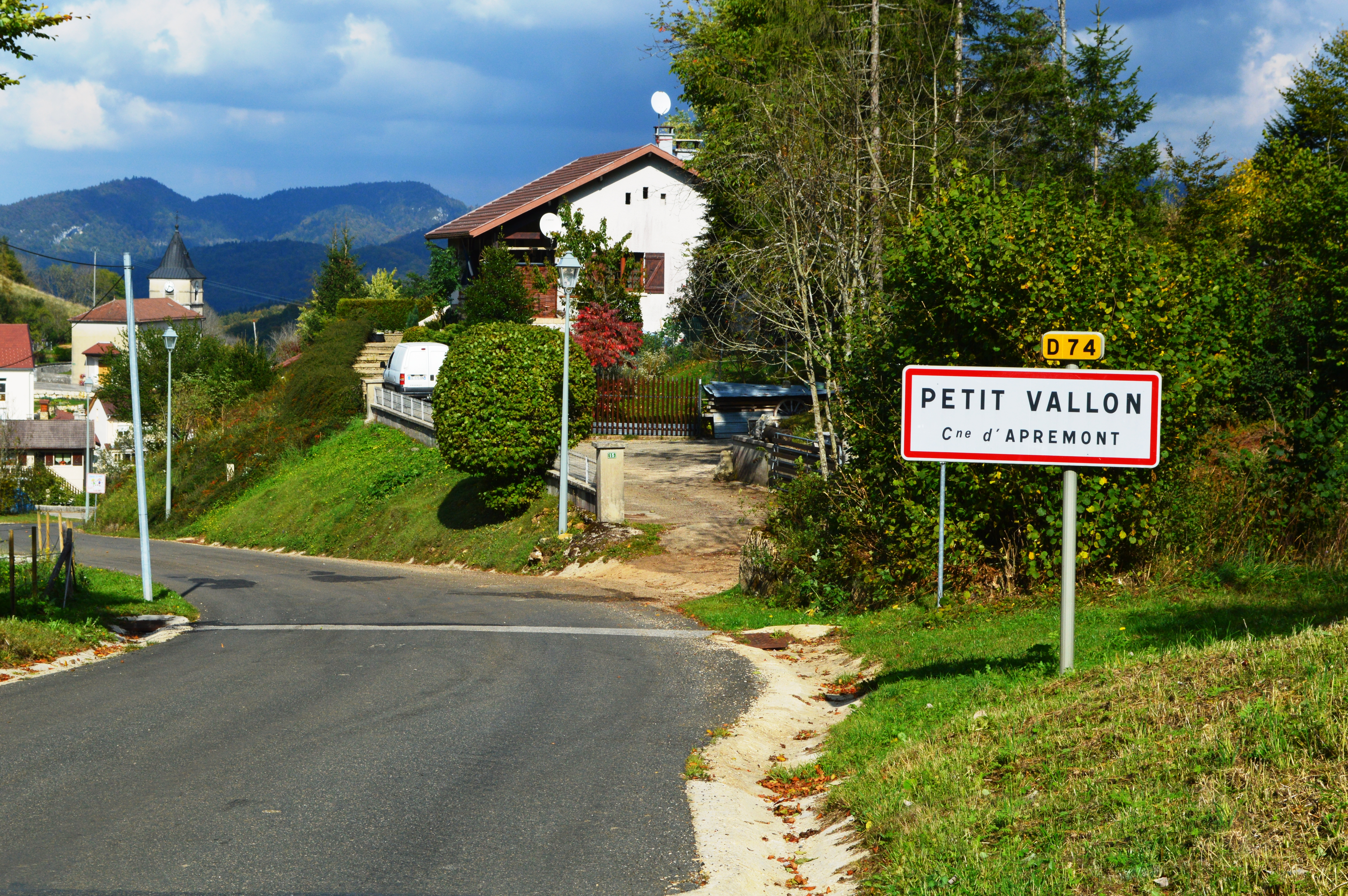
- Location of Apremont
- Location within France Location within Auvergne-Rhône-Alpes
- Coordinates: 46°12′28″N 5°39′26″E
- Country: France
- Region: Auvergne-Rhône-Alpes
- Department: Ain
- Arrondissement: Nantua
- Canton: Nantua
- Intercommunality: Haut-Bugey Agglomération

Government
  - Mayor (2026–32): Marielle Levrat
- Area^{1}: 14.57 km^{2} (5.63 sq mi)
- Elevation: 850 m (2,790 ft)
- Highest elevation: 1,042 m (3,419 ft)
- Lowest elevation: 658 m (2,159 ft)
- Population (2023): 415
  - Density: 28.5/km^{2} (73.8/sq mi)
- Time zone: UTC+01:00 (CET)
  - Summer (DST): UTC+02:00 (CEST)
- INSEE/Postal code: 01011 /01100
- Website: http://www.apremont-ain.fr/
- ^{1} French Land Register data, which excludes lakes, ponds, glaciers > 1 km^{2} (0.386 sq mi or 247 acres) and river estuaries.

Apremont (French pronunciation: [apʁəmɔ̃]) is a commune in the department of Ain in the Auvergne-Rhône-Alpes region of central-eastern France.

== Geography ==
Apremont is located halfway between Nantua and Oyonnax some 20 km north-west of Bellegarde-sur-Valserine and 40 km east of Bourg-en-Bresse. The commune has an area of 1456 hectares and is bounded by the communes of Bellignat, Oyonnax, Charix, Nantua, Montreal-la-Cluse, Martignat, and Groissiat. The commune is composed of several villages including:

- Petit Vallon
- Grand Vallon
- La Gotette
- Ablatrix

There are also a few isolated farms such as Les Éterres, le Cree, and Molet.

The commune can be accessed by road D74 from Oyonnax in the north passing through the heart of the commune and the village and continuing to Nantua in the south. There is also access via the D95 from Charix in the south-west to the town. There are also several small roads in the commune. The commune consists of forest and mountain landscape.

The Lange river rises in the town and flows north to Oyonnax before turning south and joining the Oignin at Le Mollard.

== Administration ==
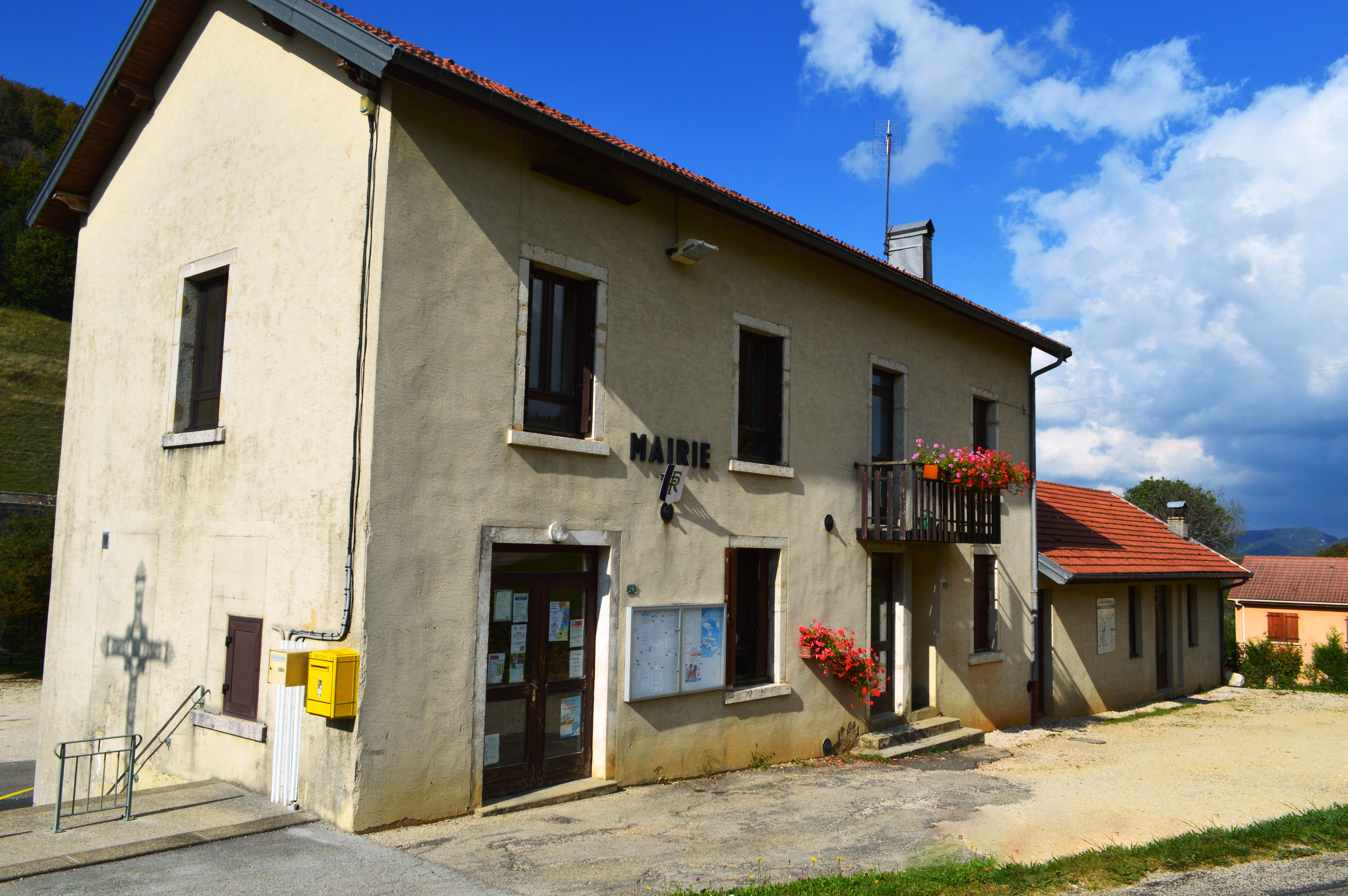
The Town Hall

List of Successive Mayors of Apremont

From	To	Name
1995	2001	Jean-Pierre Girard
2001	2008	Charles Sonthonnax
2008	2020	Jean-Pierre Girard
2020	2026	Claude Doche
2026	incumbent	Marielle Levrat

== Population ==
Historical population
Year	Pop.	±% p.a.
1968	148	—
1975	200	+4.40%
1982	279	+4.87%
1990	341	+2.54%
1999	329	−0.40%
2007	333	+0.15%
2012	385	+2.94%
2017	376	−0.47%
2023	415	+1.66%
Source: INSEE

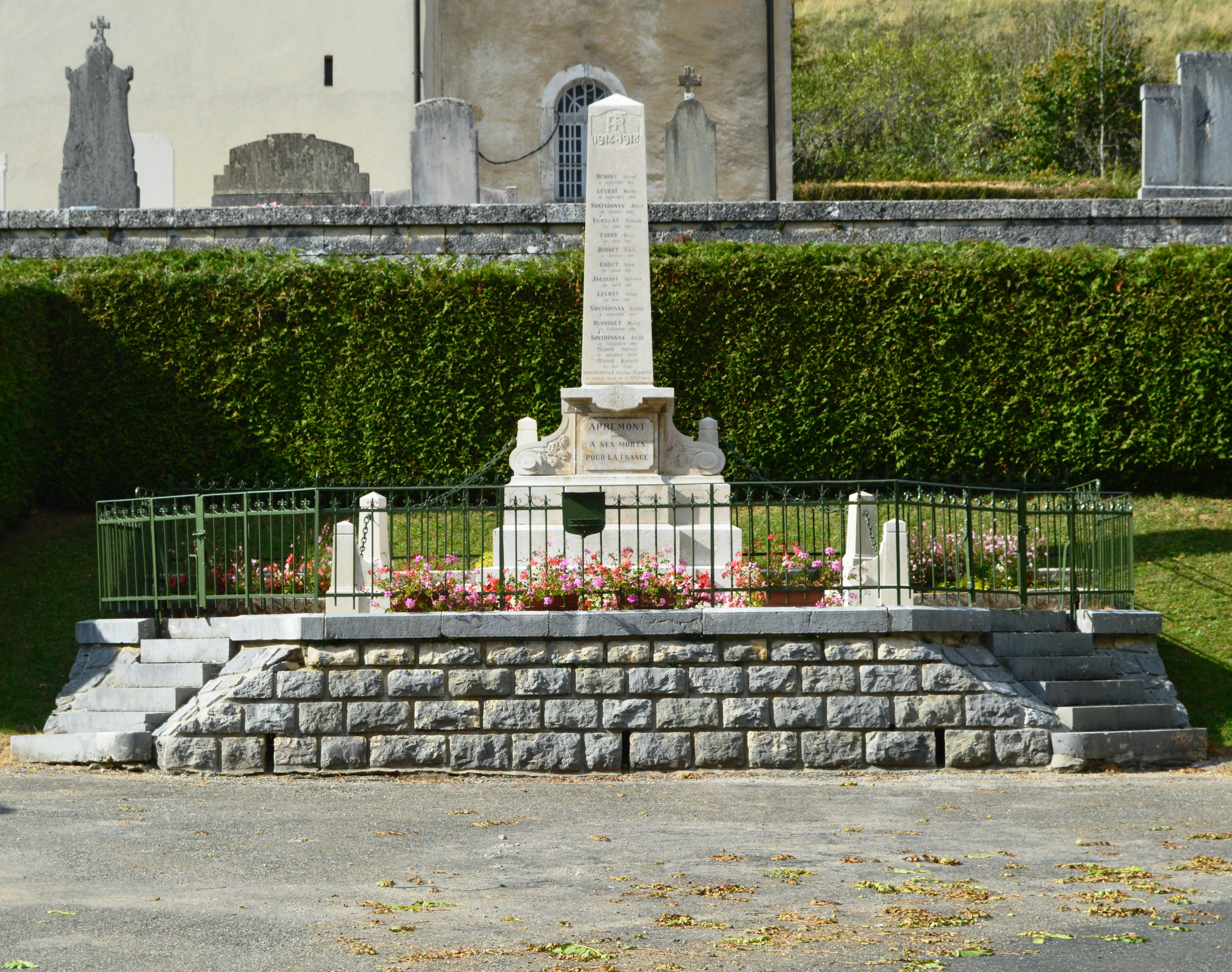
Apremont War Memorial

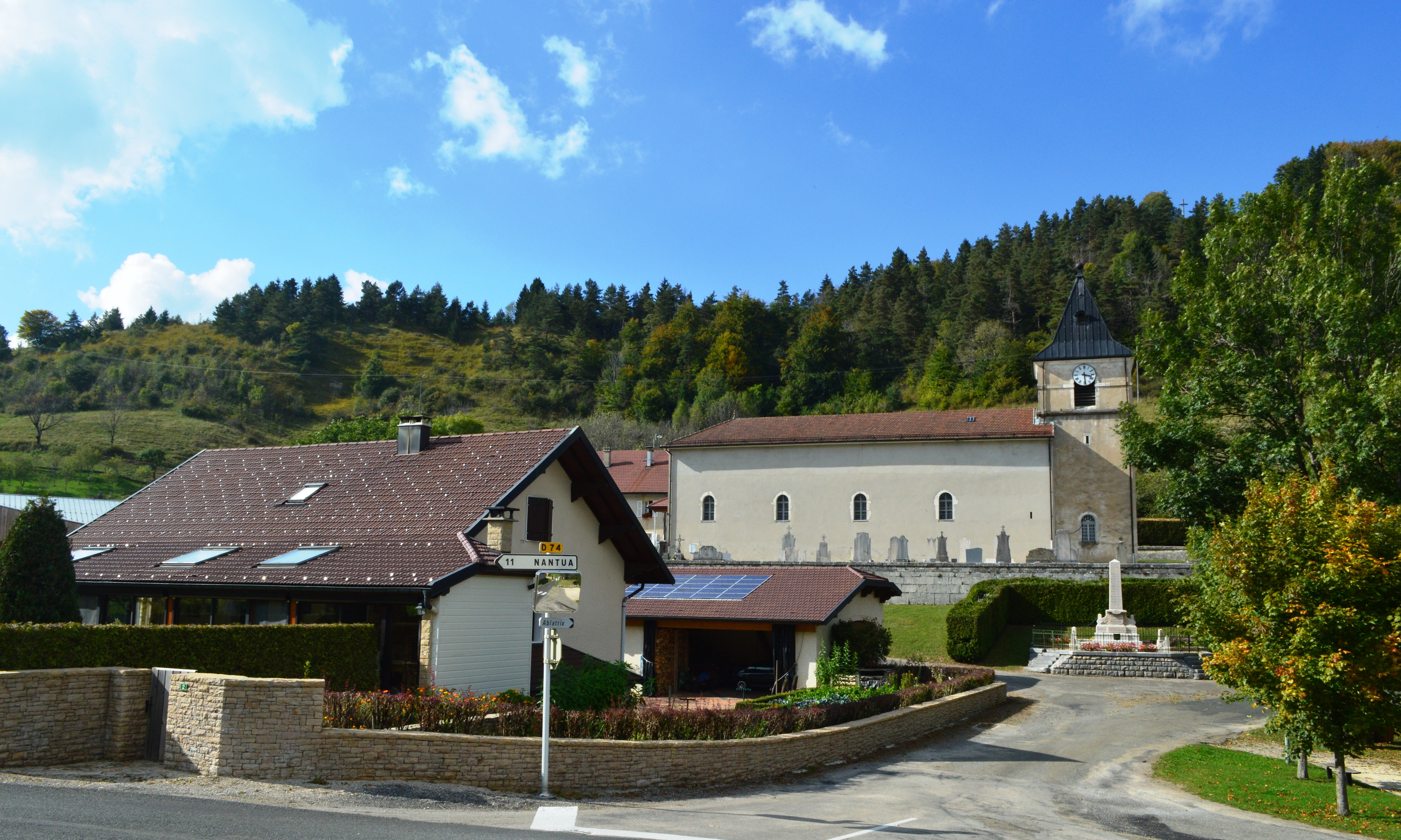
Apremont Church

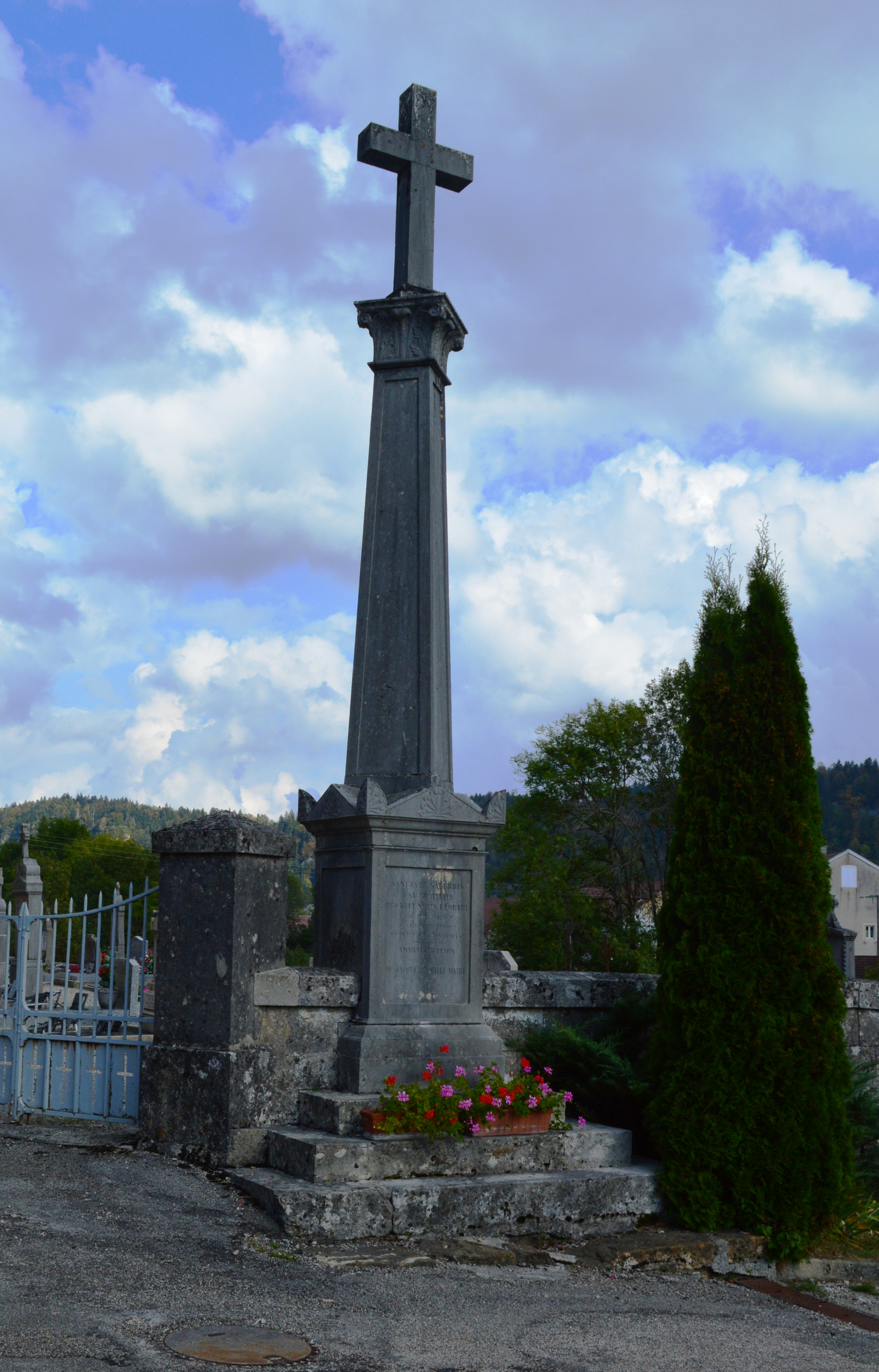
A Monumental Cross in Apremont

== Sights ==
- Ruins of a castle built in the thirteenth century.

== See also ==
- Communes of the Ain department

=== External links ===
- Apremont on Géoportail, National Geographic Institute (IGN) website (in French)
- Apremont on the 1750 Cassini Map
