= Évosges =

Commune in Auvergne-Rhône-Alpes, France

- Commune
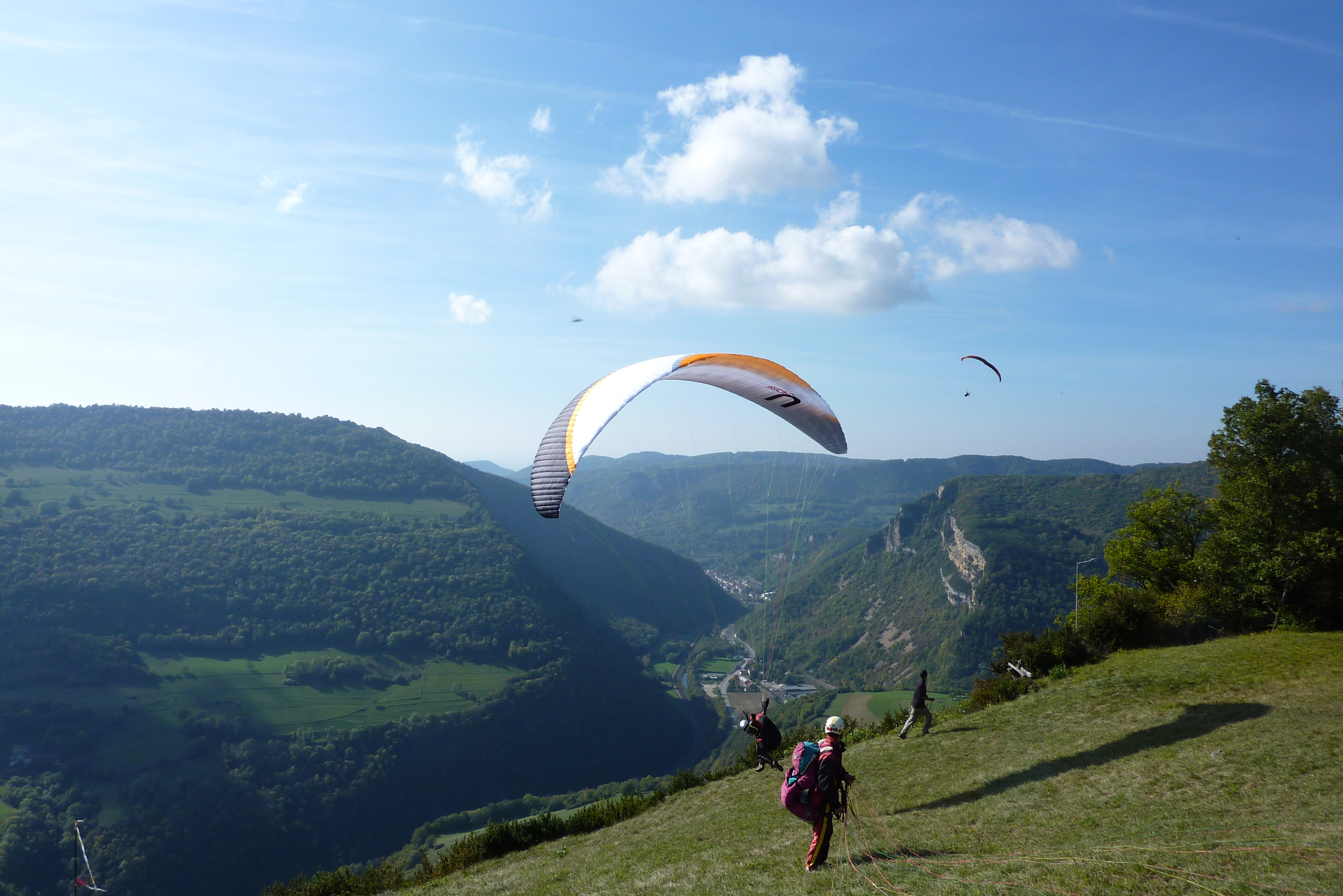
- Hang gliding
- Location of Évosges
- Location within France Location within Auvergne-Rhône-Alpes
- Coordinates: 45°57′42″N 5°29′56″E
- Country: France
- Region: Auvergne-Rhône-Alpes
- Department: Ain
- Arrondissement: Belley
- Canton: Plateau d'Hauteville
- Intercommunality: Haut-Bugey Agglomération

Government
  - Mayor (2026–32): Sophie Lajara
- Area^{1}: 12.08 km^{2} (4.66 sq mi)
- Elevation: 740 m (2,430 ft)
- Highest elevation: 1,001 m (3,284 ft)
- Lowest elevation: 560 m (1,840 ft)
- Population (2023): 142
  - Density: 11.8/km^{2} (30.4/sq mi)
- Time zone: UTC+01:00 (CET)
  - Summer (DST): UTC+02:00 (CEST)
- INSEE/Postal code: 01155 /01230
- ^{1} French Land Register data, which excludes lakes, ponds, glaciers > 1 km^{2} (0.386 sq mi or 247 acres) and river estuaries.

Évosges (French pronunciation: [evoʒ]) is a commune in the Ain department in eastern France.

== Population ==
Historical population
Year	Pop.	±% p.a.
1968	114	—
1975	101	−1.71%
1982	104	+0.42%
1990	101	−0.37%
1999	109	+0.85%
2007	125	+1.73%
2012	144	+2.87%
2017	145	+0.14%
2023	142	−0.35%
Source: INSEE

== See also ==
- Communes of the Ain department
