= Aspremont =

Aspremont is the name of 2 communes in France:

- Aspremont, Alpes-Maritimes, in the Alpes-Maritimes department
- Aspremont, Hautes-Alpes, in the Hautes-Alpes department

== Other uses ==
- Aspremont (chanson de geste), an Old French chanson de geste about a battle at Aspromonte in Italy
- House of Aspremont, a French noble family, originally from Apremont-la-Forêt

== See also ==
- Apremont (disambiguation)
- Aspromonte, a mountain massif in the province of Reggio Calabria, southern Italy
