= Haut-Bugey Agglomération =

- Communauté d'agglomération
- Location in the Ain department on 1 January 2019.
- Country: France
- Region: Auvergne-Rhône-Alpes
- Department: Ain
- No. of communes: {{{nbcomm}}}
- Established: 1 January 2014 (Communauté de communes); 1 January 2018 (Communauté d'agglomération)

Government
  - President (2022–2026): Michel Mourlevat
- Area: 688.80 km^{2} (265.95 sq mi)
- Population (2018): 63,099
  - Density: 91.607/km^{2} (237.26/sq mi)

Haut-Bugey Agglomération is a communauté d'agglomération situated in the Ain department and the Auvergne-Rhône-Alpes region of France. Created on 1 January 2014, it is composed of 42 communes and seated in Oyonnax. Its area is 688.8 km^{2}. Its population was 63,099 in 2018, of which 22,336 in Oyonnax proper. Originally a communauté de communes, the intercommunality became a communauté d'agglomération on 1 January 2018.

== History ==
On 1 January 2019 and by prefectural decree of 19 November 2018, the intercommunality absorbed the communauté de communes du plateau d'Hauteville increasing the number of communes to 42.

== Composition ==
The agglomération is composed of the 42 following communes:

List of communes in the Haut-Bugey Agglomération
Name	Code INSEE	Demonym	Area (km^{2})	Population (2018)	Density (per km^{2})
Oyonnax (seat)	01283	Oyonnaxiens	36.37	22,336	614
Apremont	01011	Marannes	14.57	373	26
Aranc	01012	Randaoillards	21.65	329	15
Arbent	01014	Arbanais	23.49	3,356	143
Béard-Géovreissiat	01170		4.69	1,064	227
Belleydoux	01035	Belleydousans	17.63	312	18
Bellignat	01031	Renouillus	7.83	3,632	464
Bolozon	01051	Bolozonnais	4.92	91	18
Brénod	01060	Brénodiens	23.79	500	21
Brion	01063	Brionais	4.48	531	119
Ceignes	01067	Ceigneurs	10.01	254	25
Champdor-Corcelles	01080		31.53	643	20
Charix	01087	Charians	18.27	281	15
Chevillard	01101	Savorays	6.67	151	23
Condamine	01112	Condaminois	4.64	432	93
Corlier	01121	Corlierons	5.45	116	21
Dortan	01148	Dortannais	18.11	1,854	102
Échallon	01152	Échallonnais	28.09	750	27
Évosges	01155	Évosgiens	12.08	144	12
Géovreisset	01171	Curossets	3.31	856	259
Groissiat	01181	Groissiatis	6.32	1,235	195
Izenave	01191	Izelois	13.04	157	12
Izernore	01192	Izernois	20.86	2,255	108
Lantenay	01206	Béguélins	6.59	277	42
Leyssard	01214		9.13	155	17
Maillat	01228	Maillatis	11.31	648	57
Martignat	01237	Martignanais	13.25	1,647	124
Matafelon-Granges	01240	Matafelonais	21.54	633	29
Montréal-la-Cluse	01265	Montréalais	12.83	3,419	266
Nantua	01269	Nantuatiens	12.79	3,410	267
Les Neyrolles	01274	Neyrollans	9.5	642	68
Nurieux-Volognat	01267		19.34	1,027	53
Outriaz	01282	Triolins	5.91	259	44
Peyriat	01293	Peyriatis	5.96	152	26
Plateau d'Hauteville	01185		106.11	4,856	46
Le Poizat-Lalleyriat	01204		33.15	729	22
Port	01307	Bédouins	4.25	842	198
Prémillieu	01311	Pennons	8.51	44	5.2
Saint-Martin-du-Frêne	01373	San-Martinois	19.14	1,038	54
Samognat	01392	Samognatis	14.01	650	46
Sonthonnax-la-Montagne	01410		14.14	306	22
Vieu-d'Izenave	01441		23.73	713	30

== Administration ==
=== Seat ===
The seat of the communauté de communes is located at 57 Rue René Nicod in Oyonnax, 01100.

=== Elected councillors ===
The conseil communautaire of the communauté d'agglomération is composed of 79 councillor representing each of the member communes and elected for six-year terms. The number of council seats each commune receives is proportional based upon their population as follows:

Number of councillors	Commune(s)
24	Oyonnax
5	Plateau d'Hauteville
3	Arbent, Bellignat, Montréal-la-Cluse and Nantua
2	Dortan and Izernore
1	Remaining communes

=== President ===
List of successive president's of Haut-Bugey Agglomération
In office		Name	Party	Capacity	Ref.
2017	2022	Jean Deguerry	LR	President of the Departmental Council of Ain (2017–present) Municipal councillor for Montréal-la-Cluse (2017–present) Mayor of Montréal-la-Cluse (2014-2017)	
2022	Incumbent	Michel Mourlevat		Mayor of Leyssard	
