= Vieu-d'Izenave =

Commune in Auvergne-Rhône-Alpes, France

Vieu-d'Izenave Viu-d’Isenâva (Arpitan)
- Commune
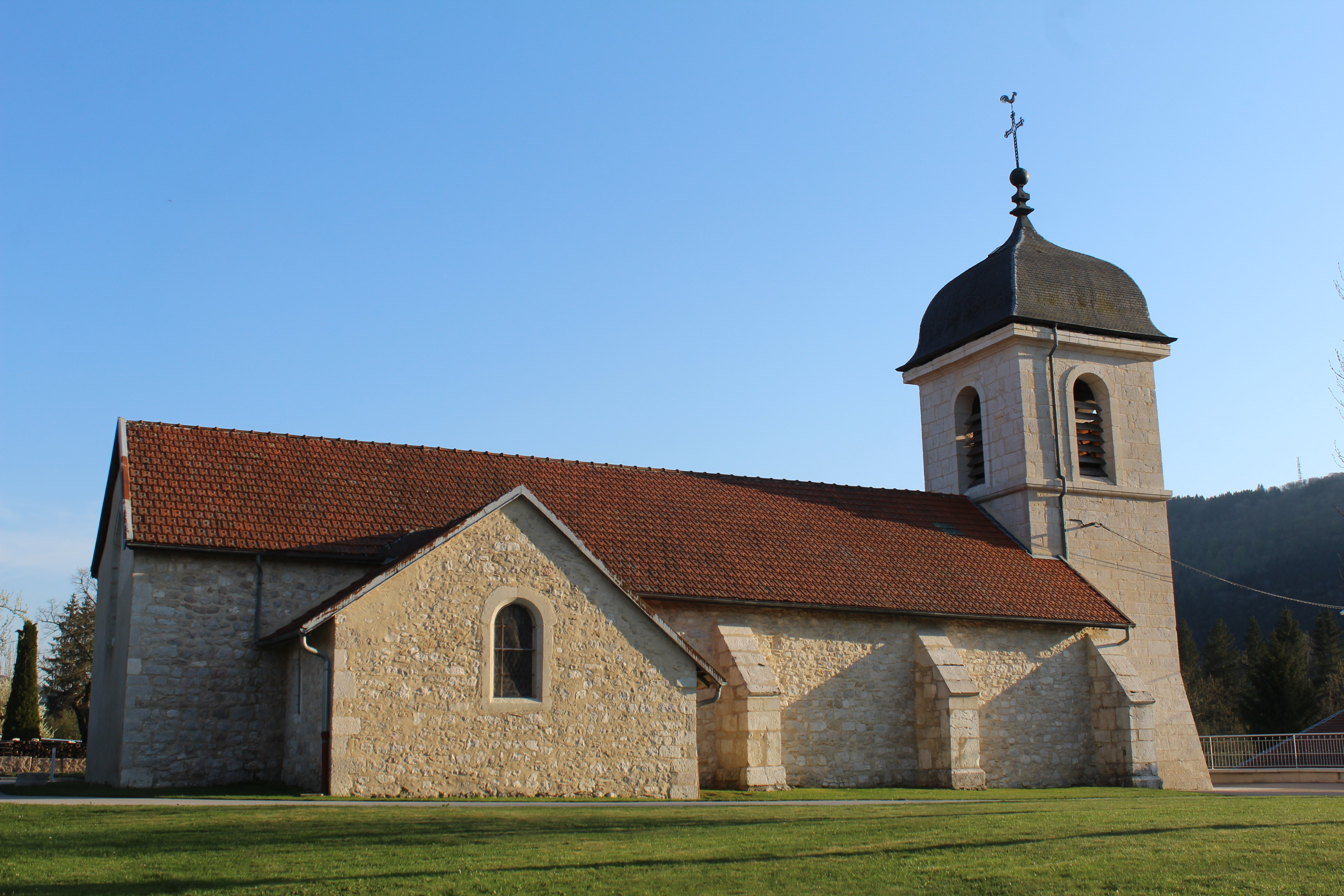
- Location of Vieu-d'Izenave
- Location within France Location within Auvergne-Rhône-Alpes
- Coordinates: 46°04′54″N 5°31′48″E
- Country: France
- Region: Auvergne-Rhône-Alpes
- Department: Ain
- Arrondissement: Nantua
- Canton: Plateau d'Hauteville
- Intercommunality: Haut-Bugey Agglomération

Government
  - Mayor (2026–32): Jérôme Saunier
- Area^{1}: 23.73 km^{2} (9.16 sq mi)
- Elevation: 380 m (1,250 ft)
- Highest elevation: 1,103 m (3,619 ft)
- Lowest elevation: 540 m (1,770 ft)
- Population (2023): 719
  - Density: 30.3/km^{2} (78.5/sq mi)
- Time zone: UTC+01:00 (CET)
  - Summer (DST): UTC+02:00 (CEST)
- INSEE/Postal code: 01441 /01430
- ^{1} French Land Register data, which excludes lakes, ponds, glaciers > 1 km^{2} (0.386 sq mi or 247 acres) and river estuaries.

Vieu-d'Izenave (French pronunciation: [vjø diznav], literally Vieu of Izenave; Arpitan: Viu-d’Isenâva) is a commune in the Ain department in eastern France.

== Geography ==
=== Climate ===
Vieu-d'Izenave has an oceanic climate (Köppen climate classification Cfb). The average annual temperature in Vieu-d'Izenave is 9.1 °C (48.4 °F). The average annual rainfall is 1,634.8 mm (64.36 in) with November as the wettest month. The temperatures are highest on average in July, at around 17.8 °C (64.0 °F), and lowest in January, at around 1.1 °C (34.0 °F). The highest temperature ever recorded in Vieu-d'Izenave was 37.7 °C (99.9 °F) on 31 July 2020; the coldest temperature ever recorded was −24.1 °C (−11.4 °F) on 7 February 2012.

Climate data for Vieu-d'Izenave (1981–2010 averages, extremes 1990−2020)
Month	Jan	Feb	Mar	Apr	May	Jun	Jul	Aug	Sep	Oct	Nov	Dec	Year
Record high °C (°F)	19.1 (66.4)	20.5 (68.9)	23.1 (73.6)	26.9 (80.4)	30.8 (87.4)	36.0 (96.8)	37.7 (99.9)	37.0 (98.6)	32.0 (89.6)	26.6 (79.9)	22.7 (72.9)	17.2 (63.0)	37.7 (99.9)
Mean daily maximum °C (°F)	5.4 (41.7)	6.8 (44.2)	10.5 (50.9)	13.6 (56.5)	18.4 (65.1)	21.8 (71.2)	24.2 (75.6)	24.1 (75.4)	19.1 (66.4)	15.1 (59.2)	8.9 (48.0)	5.4 (41.7)	14.5 (58.1)
Daily mean °C (°F)	1.1 (34.0)	1.9 (35.4)	5.0 (41.0)	7.7 (45.9)	12.3 (54.1)	15.5 (59.9)	17.8 (64.0)	17.5 (63.5)	13.4 (56.1)	10.2 (50.4)	4.8 (40.6)	1.5 (34.7)	9.1 (48.4)
Mean daily minimum °C (°F)	−3.2 (26.2)	−2.9 (26.8)	−0.6 (30.9)	1.8 (35.2)	6.3 (43.3)	9.2 (48.6)	11.3 (52.3)	11.0 (51.8)	7.7 (45.9)	5.3 (41.5)	0.7 (33.3)	−2.4 (27.7)	3.7 (38.7)
Record low °C (°F)	−22.5 (−8.5)	−24.1 (−11.4)	−22.5 (−8.5)	−9.4 (15.1)	−5.3 (22.5)	−1.5 (29.3)	2.0 (35.6)	−0.2 (31.6)	−3.0 (26.6)	−8.6 (16.5)	−15.0 (5.0)	−22.4 (−8.3)	−24.1 (−11.4)
Average precipitation mm (inches)	127.2 (5.01)	132.4 (5.21)	117.3 (4.62)	132.5 (5.22)	133.8 (5.27)	122.1 (4.81)	117.3 (4.62)	118.0 (4.65)	145.0 (5.71)	164.0 (6.46)	170.4 (6.71)	154.8 (6.09)	1,634.8 (64.36)
Average precipitation days (≥ 1.0 mm)	11.4	11.9	11.1	12.1	12.9	10.8	9.7	9.8	10.1	13.0	13.5	13.6	139.8
Source: Meteociel

== Population ==
Historical population
Year	Pop.	±% p.a.
1968	388	—
1975	379	−0.33%
1982	452	+2.55%
1990	524	+1.86%
1999	537	+0.27%
2007	667	+2.75%
2012	683	+0.48%
2017	707	+0.69%
2023	719	+0.28%
Source: INSEE

== See also ==
- Communes of the Ain department
