= Corlier =

Commune in Auvergne-Rhône-Alpes, France

- Commune
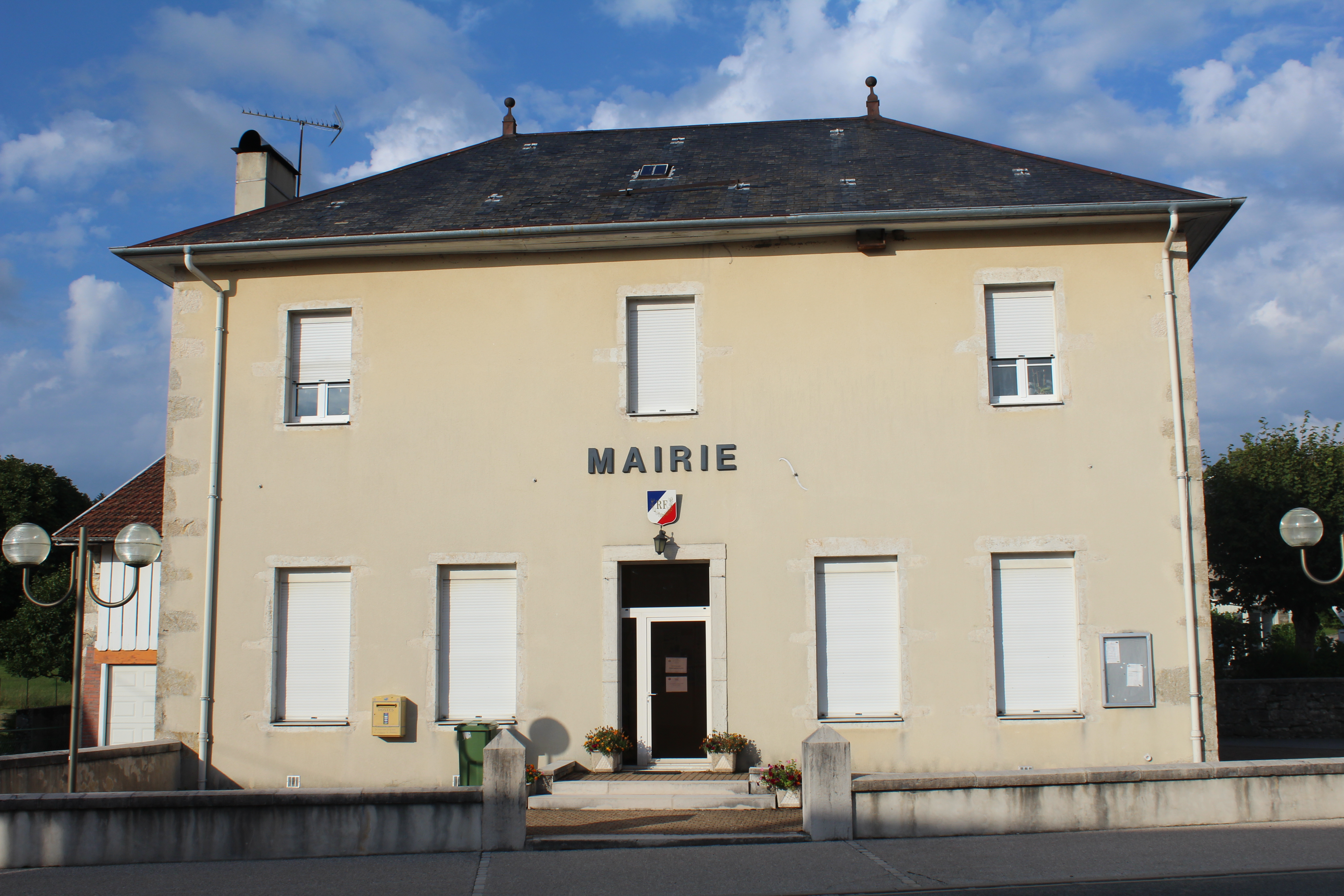
- Town hall

- Coat of arms
- Location of Corlier
- Location within France Location within Auvergne-Rhône-Alpes
- Coordinates: 46°01′49″N 5°29′57″E
- Country: France
- Region: Auvergne-Rhône-Alpes
- Department: Ain
- Arrondissement: Belley
- Canton: Plateau d'Hauteville
- Intercommunality: Haut-Bugey Agglomération

Government
  - Mayor (2020–2026): Jean-François Dupont
- Area^{1}: 5.45 km^{2} (2.10 sq mi)
- Elevation: 800 m (2,600 ft)
- Highest elevation: 917 m (3,009 ft)
- Lowest elevation: 560 m (1,840 ft)
- Population (2023): 116
  - Density: 21.3/km^{2} (55.1/sq mi)
- Time zone: UTC+01:00 (CET)
  - Summer (DST): UTC+02:00 (CEST)
- INSEE/Postal code: 01121 /01110
- ^{1} French Land Register data, which excludes lakes, ponds, glaciers > 1 km^{2} (0.386 sq mi or 247 acres) and river estuaries.

Corlier (French pronunciation: [kɔʁlje]) is a commune in the Ain department in eastern France.

== Population ==
Historical population
Year	Pop.	±% p.a.
1968	65	—
1975	69	+0.86%
1982	66	−0.63%
1990	76	+1.78%
1999	73	−0.45%
2007	114	+5.73%
2012	119	+0.86%
2017	114	−0.85%
2023	116	+0.29%
Source: INSEE

== See also ==
- Communes of the Ain department
