= Corbonod =

Commune in Auvergne-Rhône-Alpes, France

- Commune
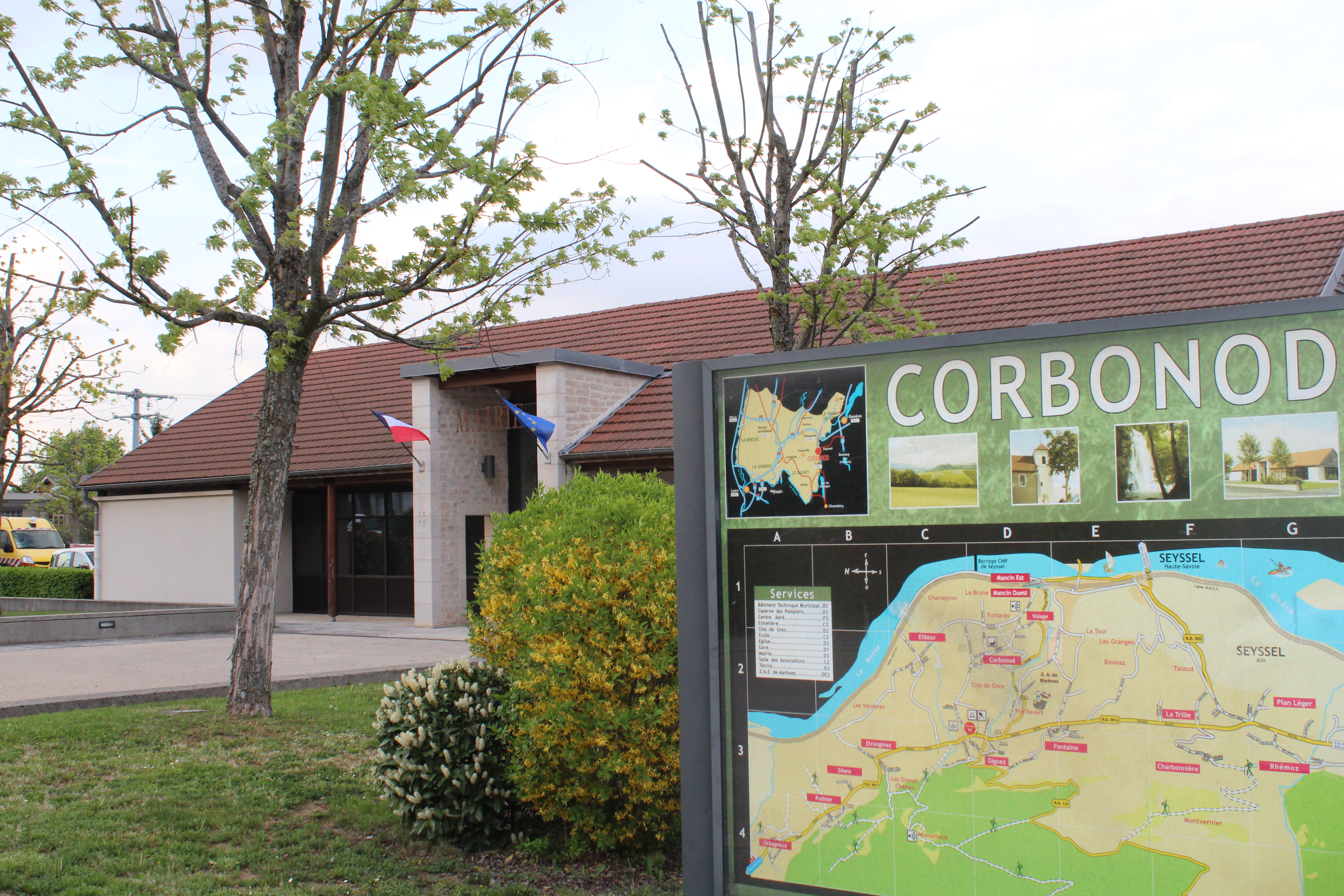
- Town hall
- Location of Corbonod
- Location within France Location within Auvergne-Rhône-Alpes
- Coordinates: 45°57′00″N 5°49′00″E
- Country: France
- Region: Auvergne-Rhône-Alpes
- Department: Ain
- Arrondissement: Belley
- Canton: Plateau d'Hauteville

Government
  - Mayor (2026–32): Damien Guichon
- Area^{1}: 31.59 km^{2} (12.20 sq mi)
- Elevation: 258 m (846 ft)
- Highest elevation: 1,390 m (4,560 ft)
- Lowest elevation: 250 m (820 ft)
- Population (2023): 1,333
  - Density: 42.20/km^{2} (109.3/sq mi)
- Time zone: UTC+01:00 (CET)
  - Summer (DST): UTC+02:00 (CEST)
- INSEE/Postal code: 01118 /01420
- ^{1} French Land Register data, which excludes lakes, ponds, glaciers > 1 km^{2} (0.386 sq mi or 247 acres) and river estuaries.

Corbonod (French pronunciation: [kɔʁbɔno]) is a commune in the Ain department in eastern France.

== Population ==
Historical population
Year	Pop.	±% p.a.
1968	917	—
1975	884	−0.52%
1982	839	−0.74%
1990	841	+0.03%
1999	898	+0.73%
2007	1,105	+2.63%
2012	1,203	+1.71%
2017	1,264	+0.99%
2023	1,333	+0.89%
Source: INSEE

== See also ==
- Communes of the Ain department
