= Tenay =

Commune in Auvergne-Rhône-Alpes, France

- Commune
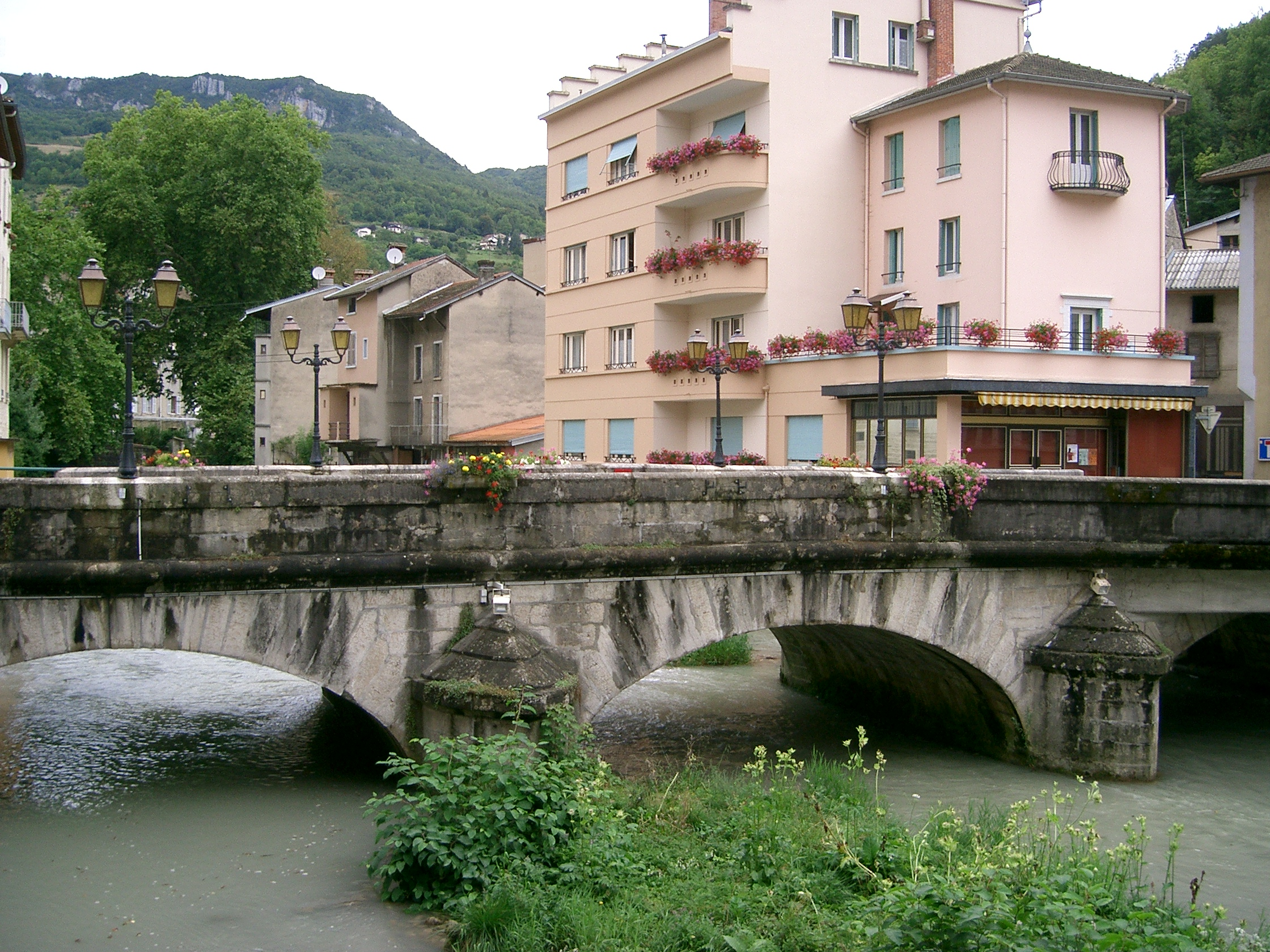
- The Albarine

- Coat of arms
- Location of Tenay
- Location within France Location within Auvergne-Rhône-Alpes
- Coordinates: 45°55′00″N 5°30′00″E
- Country: France
- Region: Auvergne-Rhône-Alpes
- Department: Ain
- Arrondissement: Belley
- Canton: Plateau d'Hauteville

Government
  - Mayor (2026–32): Gaël Allain
- Area^{1}: 13.12 km^{2} (5.07 sq mi)
- Elevation: 327 m (1,073 ft)
- Highest elevation: 1,020 m (3,350 ft)
- Lowest elevation: 320 m (1,050 ft)
- Population (2023): 1,030
  - Density: 78.5/km^{2} (203/sq mi)
- Demonym: Tenaysiens
- Time zone: UTC+01:00 (CET)
  - Summer (DST): UTC+02:00 (CEST)
- INSEE/Postal code: 01416 /01230
- ^{1} French Land Register data, which excludes lakes, ponds, glaciers > 1 km^{2} (0.386 sq mi or 247 acres) and river estuaries.

Tenay (French pronunciation: [tənɛ]) is a commune in the Ain department in eastern France.

== Geography ==
The river Albarine flows southwest through the commune's eastern part, crosses the village, then flows northwest.

== Population ==
Historical population
| Year | Pop. | ±% p.a. |
|---|---|---|
| 1968 | 1,993 | — |
| 1975 | 1,715 | −2.12% |
| 1982 | 1,571 | −1.25% |
| 1990 | 1,356 | −1.82% |
| 1999 | 1,086 | −2.44% |
| 2007 | 1,103 | +0.19% |
| 2012 | 1,085 | −0.33% |
| 2017 | 1,035 | −0.94% |
| 2023 | 1,030 | −0.08% |
Source: INSEE

== See also ==
- Communes of the Ain department
