= Outriaz =

Commune in Auvergne-Rhône-Alpes, France

- Commune
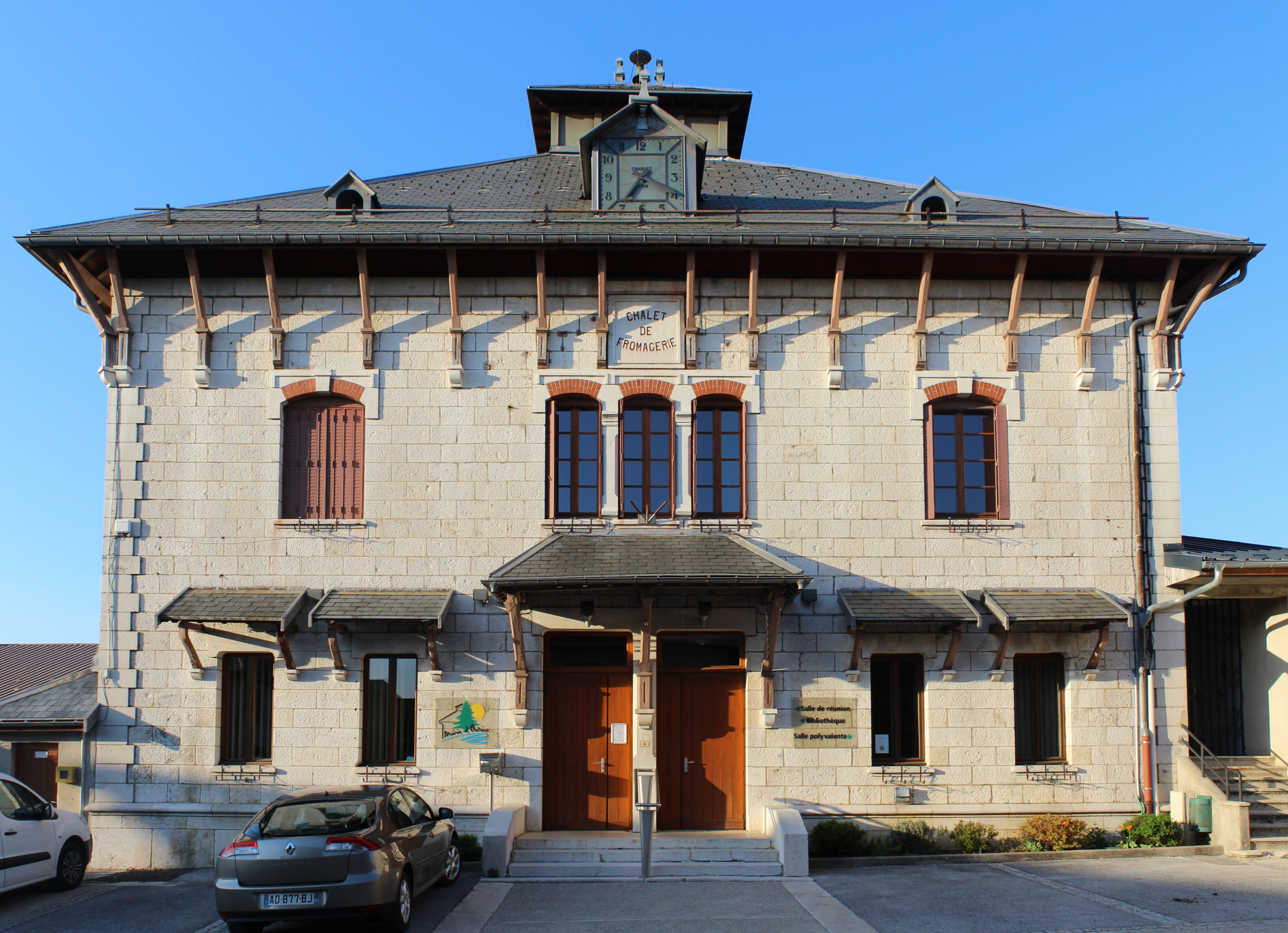
- Town hall
- Location of Outriaz
- Location within France Location within Auvergne-Rhône-Alpes
- Coordinates: 46°04′05″N 5°32′51″E
- Country: France
- Region: Auvergne-Rhône-Alpes
- Department: Ain
- Arrondissement: Nantua
- Canton: Plateau d'Hauteville
- Intercommunality: Haut-Bugey Agglomération

Government
  - Mayor (2026–32): Jean-François Roy
- Area^{1}: 5.91 km^{2} (2.28 sq mi)
- Elevation: 680 m (2,230 ft)
- Highest elevation: 1,103 m (3,619 ft)
- Lowest elevation: 647 m (2,123 ft)
- Population (2023): 263
  - Density: 44.5/km^{2} (115/sq mi)
- Time zone: UTC+01:00 (CET)
  - Summer (DST): UTC+02:00 (CEST)
- INSEE/Postal code: 01282 /01430
- ^{1} French Land Register data, which excludes lakes, ponds, glaciers > 1 km^{2} (0.386 sq mi or 247 acres) and river estuaries.

Outriaz is a commune in the Ain department in eastern France.

== Population ==
Historical population
Year	Pop.	±% p.a.
1968	225	—
1975	204	−1.39%
1982	255	+3.24%
1990	275	+0.95%
1999	264	−0.45%
2007	275	+0.51%
2012	254	−1.58%
2017	260	+0.47%
2023	263	+0.19%
Source: INSEE

== See also ==
- Communes of the Ain department
