= Canton of Plateau d'Hauteville =

Coordinates: 45°58′45″N 5°36′19″E

Plateau d'Hauteville
- Canton
- Interactive map of Plateau d'Hauteville
- Country: France
- Region: Auvergne-Rhône-Alpes
- Department: Ain
- No. of communes: {{{nbcomm}}}
- Area: 633.44 km^{2} (244.57 sq mi)
- Population (2023): 22,268
  - Density: 35.154/km^{2} (91.049/sq mi)
- INSEE code: 01 10

The canton of Plateau d'Hauteville (before February 2021: canton of Hauteville-Lompnes) is an administrative division in eastern France. At the French canton reorganisation which came into effect in March 2015, the canton was expanded from 6 to 41 communes (21 of which have since merged into the new communes of Champdor-Corcelles, Culoz-Béon, Haut-Valromey, Plateau d'Hauteville, Valromey-sur-Séran and Arvière-en-Valromey):

1. Anglefort
2. Aranc
3. Armix
4. Artemare
5. Arvière-en-Valromey
6. Brénod
7. Chaley
8. Champagne-en-Valromey
9. Champdor-Corcelles
10. Chevillard
11. Condamine
12. Corbonod
13. Corlier
14. Culoz-Béon
15. Évosges
16. Haut-Valromey
17. Izenave
18. Lantenay
19. Outriaz
20. Plateau d'Hauteville
21. Prémillieu
22. Seyssel
23. Talissieu
24. Tenay
25. Valromey-sur-Séran
26. Vieu-d'Izenave

== Demographics ==
Historical population
Year	Pop.	±% p.a.
2013	22,124	—
2018	22,038	−0.08%
Source: INSEE

== See also ==
- Cantons of the Ain department
- Communes of France
