= Chevillard, Ain =

Commune in Auvergne-Rhône-Alpes, France

Chevillard
- Commune
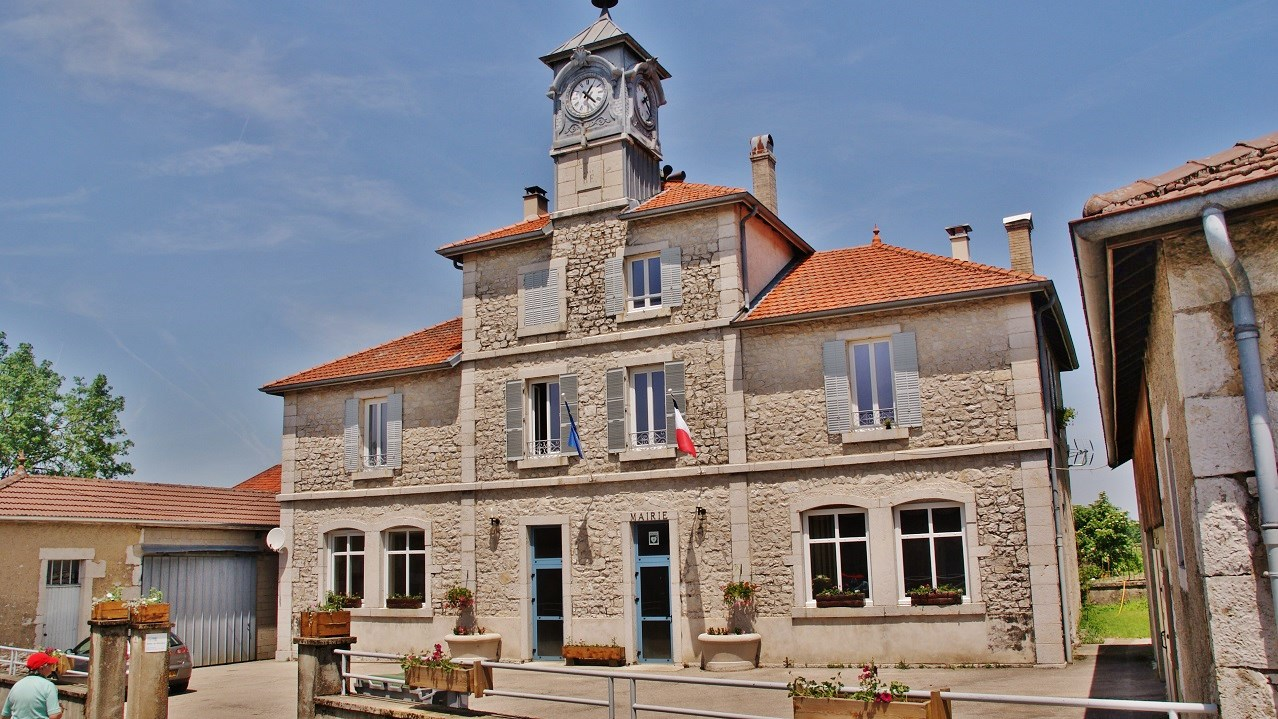
- Town hall
- Location of Chevillard
- Location within France Location within Auvergne-Rhône-Alpes
- Coordinates: 46°06′37″N 5°34′57″E
- Country: France
- Region: Auvergne-Rhône-Alpes
- Department: Ain
- Arrondissement: Nantua
- Canton: Plateau d'Hauteville
- Intercommunality: Haut-Bugey Agglomération

Government
  - Mayor (2026–32): Pierrick Monnet
- Area^{1}: 9.67 km^{2} (3.73 sq mi)
- Elevation: 830 m (2,720 ft)
- Highest elevation: 1,108 m (3,635 ft)
- Lowest elevation: 660 m (2,170 ft)
- Population (2023): 149
  - Density: 15.4/km^{2} (39.9/sq mi)
- Time zone: UTC+01:00 (CET)
  - Summer (DST): UTC+02:00 (CEST)
- INSEE/Postal code: 01101 /01430
- ^{1} French Land Register data, which excludes lakes, ponds, glaciers > 1 km^{2} (0.386 sq mi or 247 acres) and river estuaries.

Chevillard is a commune in the Ain department in eastern France.

== Population ==
Historical population
Year	Pop.	±% p.a.
1968	126	—
1975	116	−1.17%
1982	132	+1.86%
1990	137	+0.47%
1999	132	−0.41%
2007	181	+4.03%
2012	160	−2.44%
2017	151	−1.15%
2023	149	−0.22%
Source: INSEE

== See also ==
- Communes of the Ain department
