= Montréal-la-Cluse =

Commune in Auvergne-Rhône-Alpes, France

- Commune
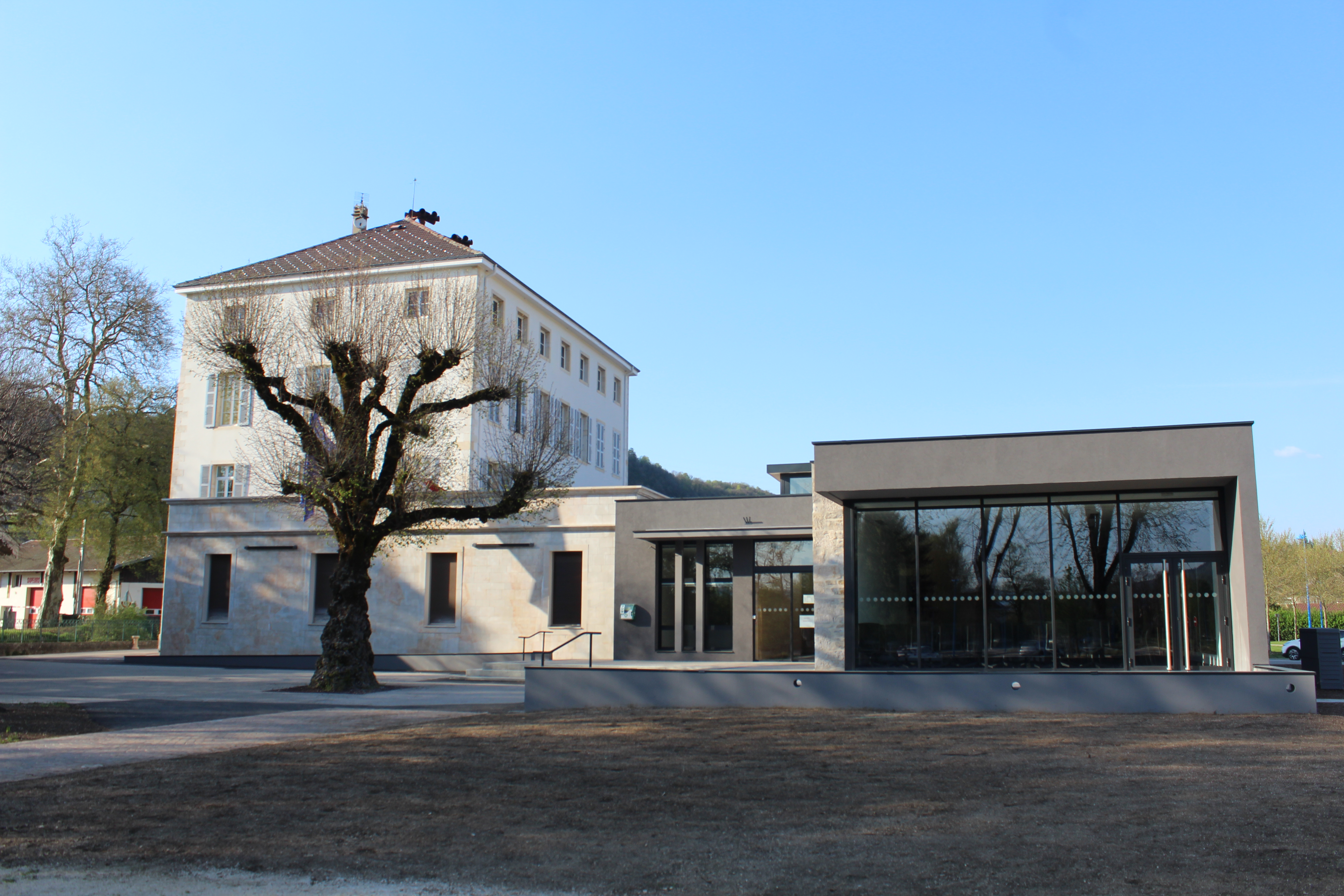
- Town hall

- Coat of arms
- Location of Montréal-la-Cluse
- Location within France Location within Auvergne-Rhône-Alpes
- Coordinates: 46°11′00″N 5°34′00″E
- Country: France
- Region: Auvergne-Rhône-Alpes
- Department: Ain
- Arrondissement: Nantua
- Canton: Nantua
- Intercommunality: Haut-Bugey Agglomération

Government
  - Mayor (2026–32): Patrick Dufour
- Area^{1}: 12.83 km^{2} (4.95 sq mi)
- Elevation: 500 m (1,600 ft)
- Population (2023): 3,568
  - Density: 278.1/km^{2} (720.3/sq mi)
- Time zone: UTC+01:00 (CET)
  - Summer (DST): UTC+02:00 (CEST)
- INSEE/Postal code: 01265 /01460
- ^{1} French Land Register data, which excludes lakes, ponds, glaciers > 1 km^{2} (0.386 sq mi or 247 acres) and river estuaries.

Montréal-la-Cluse (French pronunciation: [mɔ̃ʁe.al la klyz]) is a commune in the Ain department in eastern France. It is located in the historical region of Bugey and its inhabitants are known as the Montréalais.

== Transport ==
The town lies on the Haut Bugey railway line and a branch line to Oyonnax. Brion—Montréal-la-Cluse station has rail connections to Bourg-en-Bresse and Oyonnax.

== Population ==
Historical population

Year	Pop.	±% p.a.
1793	645	—
1800	627	−0.40%
1806	802	+4.19%
1821	815	+0.11%
1831	773	−0.53%
1836	826	+1.34%
1841	824	−0.05%
1846	843	+0.46%
1851	844	+0.02%
1856	941	+2.20%
1861	1,008	+1.39%
1866	1,064	+1.09%
1872	1,111	+0.72%
1876	1,195	+1.84%
1881	1,148	−0.80%
1886	1,083	−1.16%
1891	1,101	+0.33%
1896	1,153	+0.93%
1901	1,129	−0.42%

Year	Pop.	±% p.a.
1906	1,045	−1.53%
1911	966	−1.56%
1921	958	−0.08%
1926	1,062	+2.08%
1931	1,205	+2.56%
1936	1,202	−0.05%
1946	1,213	+0.09%
1954	1,404	+1.84%
1962	1,640	+1.96%
1968	1,926	+2.72%
1975	2,560	+4.15%
1982	3,042	+2.50%
1990	3,496	+1.75%
1999	3,652	+0.49%
2007	3,521	−0.46%
2012	3,424	−0.56%
2017	3,435	+0.06%
2023	3,568	+0.64%

Source: EHESS and INSEE (1968-2023)

== See also ==
- Communes of the Ain department
