= Prémillieu =

Commune in Auvergne-Rhône-Alpes, France

- Commune
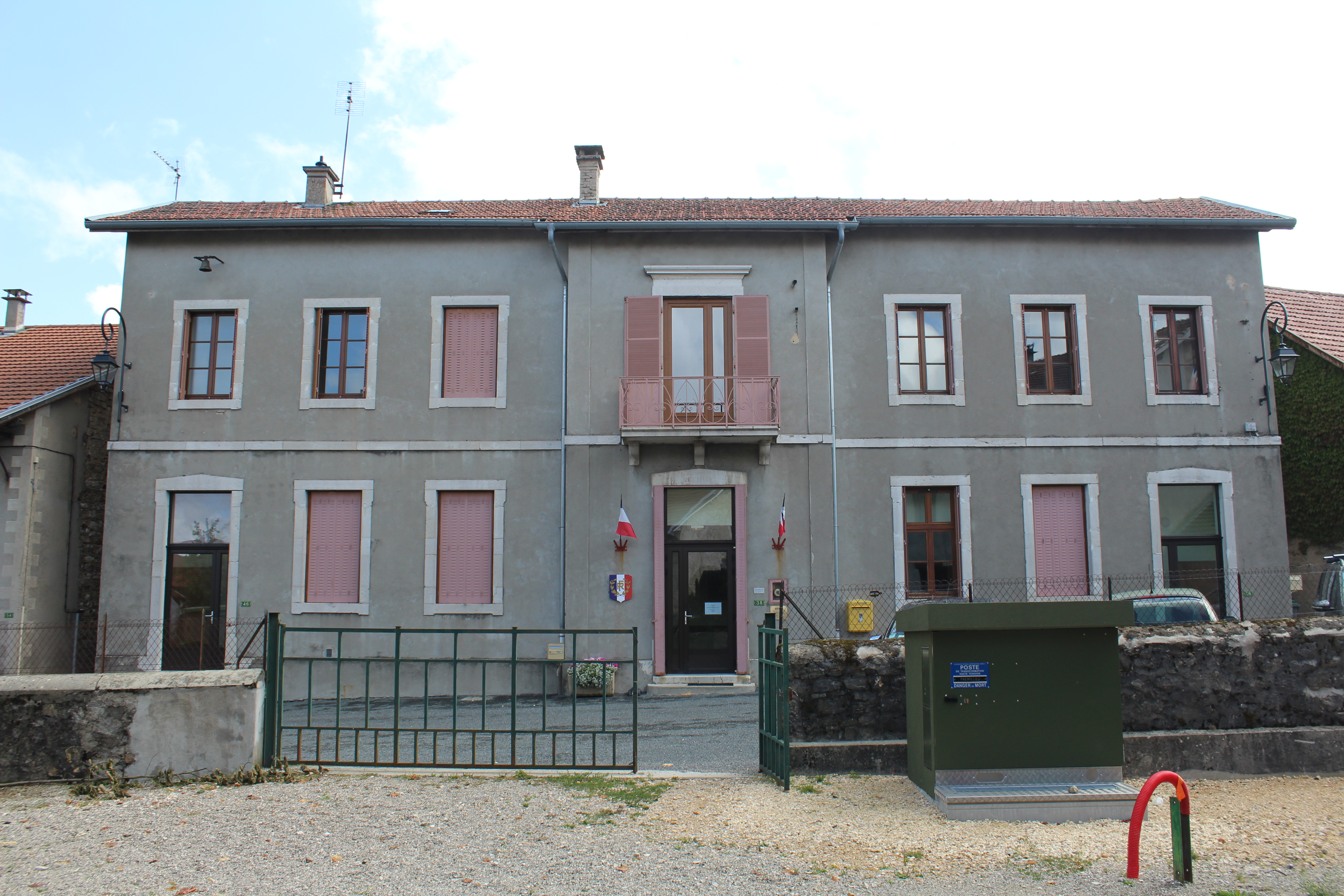
- Town hall

- Coat of arms
- Location of Prémillieu
- Location within France Location within Auvergne-Rhône-Alpes
- Coordinates: 45°52′27″N 5°34′17″E
- Country: France
- Region: Auvergne-Rhône-Alpes
- Department: Ain
- Arrondissement: Belley
- Canton: Plateau d'Hauteville
- Intercommunality: Haut-Bugey Agglomération

Government
  - Mayor (2020–2026): Pascal Torrion
- Area^{1}: 8.5 km^{2} (3.3 sq mi)
- Elevation: 896 m (2,940 ft)
- Highest elevation: 1,084 m (3,556 ft)
- Lowest elevation: 580 m (1,900 ft)
- Population (2023): 49
  - Density: 5.8/km^{2} (15/sq mi)
- Time zone: UTC+01:00 (CET)
  - Summer (DST): UTC+02:00 (CEST)
- INSEE/Postal code: 01311 /01110
- ^{1} French Land Register data, which excludes lakes, ponds, glaciers > 1 km^{2} (0.386 sq mi or 247 acres) and river estuaries.

Prémillieu (French pronunciation: [pʁemiljø]) is a commune in the Ain department in eastern France.

== Demographics ==
In 2023, the commune had a population density of 5.8 inhabitants per square kilometre and 27 households. Between 2017 and 2023, its population increased at an average annual rate of 1.4%.

Historical population
Year	Pop.	±% p.a.
1968	78	—
1975	74	−0.75%
1982	53	−4.66%
1990	40	−3.46%
1999	33	−2.11%
2007	34	+0.37%
2012	42	+4.32%
2017	45	+1.39%
2023	49	+1.43%
Source: INSEE

== Housing ==
Among the principal residences in Prémillieu that had been built before 2021, 40.7% dated from before 1919. Most of these older dwellings were houses rather than apartments.

== See also ==
- Communes of the Ain department
