= Martignat =

Commune in Auvergne-Rhône-Alpes, France

- Commune
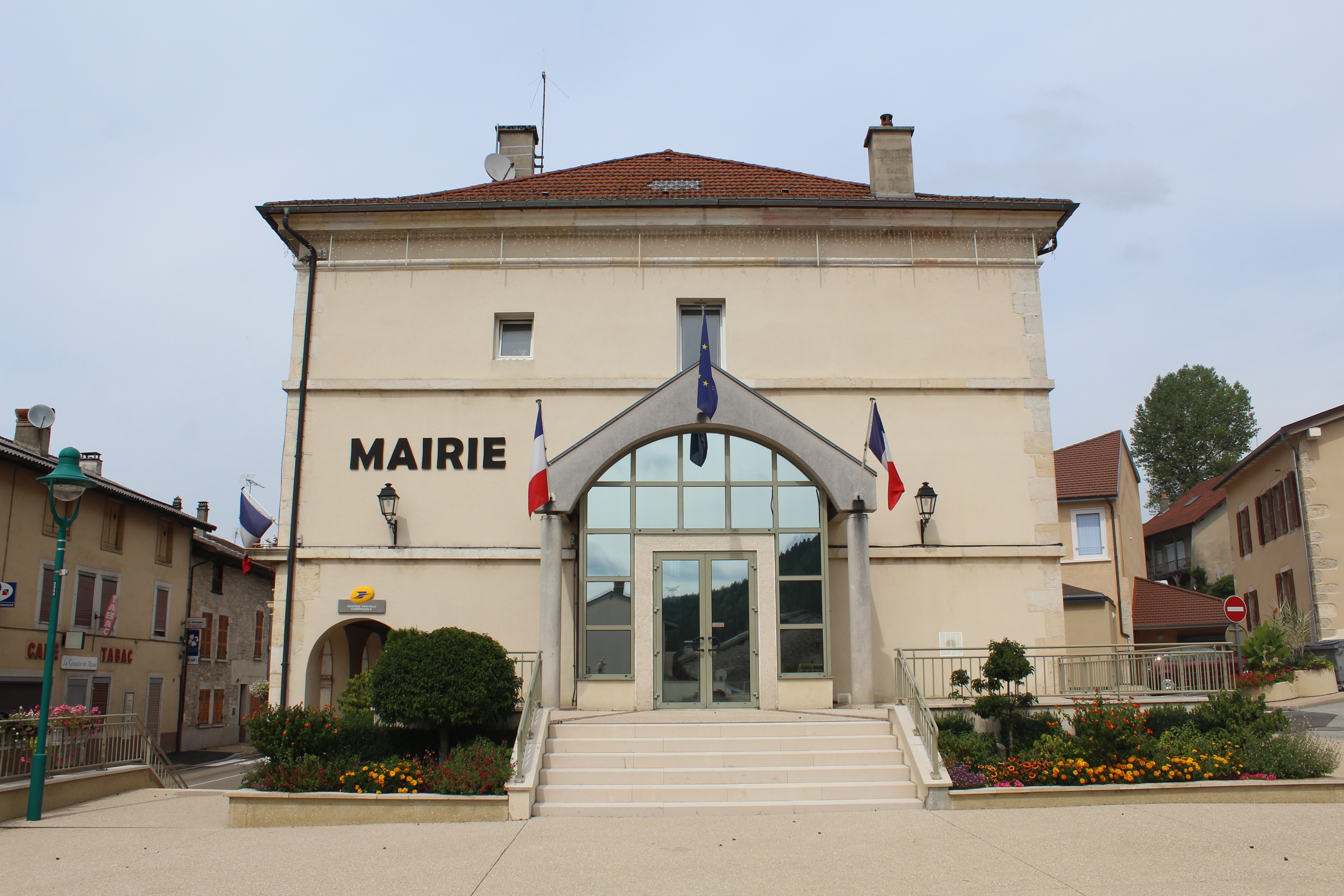
- Town hall
- Location of Martignat
- Location within France Location within Auvergne-Rhône-Alpes
- Coordinates: 46°12′36″N 5°36′34″E
- Country: France
- Region: Auvergne-Rhône-Alpes
- Department: Ain
- Arrondissement: Nantua
- Canton: Nantua
- Intercommunality: Haut-Bugey Agglomération

Government
  - Mayor (2026–32): Marilyn Pechoux
- Area^{1}: 13.25 km^{2} (5.12 sq mi)
- Elevation: 514 m (1,686 ft)
- Highest elevation: 974 m (3,196 ft)
- Lowest elevation: 490 m (1,610 ft)
- Population (2023): 1,664
  - Density: 125.6/km^{2} (325.3/sq mi)
- Time zone: UTC+01:00 (CET)
  - Summer (DST): UTC+02:00 (CEST)
- INSEE/Postal code: 01237 /01100
- ^{1} French Land Register data, which excludes lakes, ponds, glaciers > 1 km^{2} (0.386 sq mi or 247 acres) and river estuaries.

Martignat (French pronunciation: [maʁtiɲa]; Arpitan: Martegnê) is a commune in the Ain department in the Auvergne-Rhône-Alpes region in eastern France.

== Politics and administration ==
List of Mayors of Martignat
In office		Name	Party	Capacity	Ref.
1860s		François-Marie Gaget		One of 36 jurors during the trial of Martin Dumollard.	
1989	March 2014	Guy Jacquiot			
March 2014	May 2020	Yves Locatelli	Ind.	Retired	
May 2020	2026	Julien Issartel			
2026	incumbent	Marilyn Pechoux			

== Population ==
Historical population
Year	Pop.	±% p.a.
1968	547	—
1975	791	+5.41%
1982	875	+1.45%
1990	1,003	+1.72%
1999	1,265	+2.61%
2007	1,564	+2.69%
2012	1,585	+0.27%
2017	1,654	+0.86%
2023	1,664	+0.10%
Source: INSEE

== See also ==
- Communes of the Ain department
