= Brénod =

Commune in Auvergne-Rhône-Alpes, France

- Commune
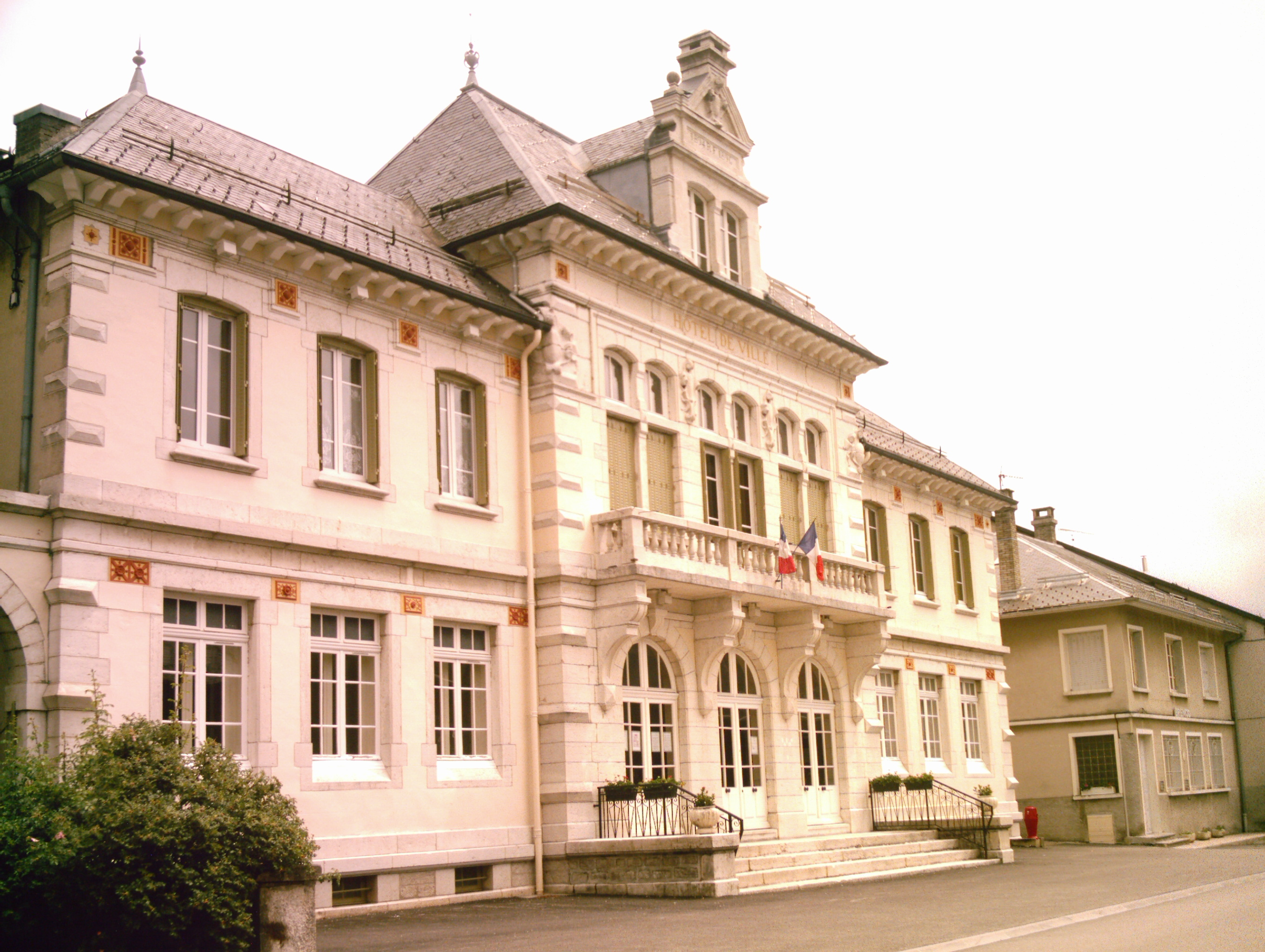
- Town hall

- Coat of arms
- Location of Brénod
- Location within France Location within Auvergne-Rhône-Alpes
- Coordinates: 46°03′39″N 5°36′22″E
- Country: France
- Region: Auvergne-Rhône-Alpes
- Department: Ain
- Arrondissement: Nantua
- Canton: Plateau d'Hauteville
- Intercommunality: Haut-Bugey Agglomération

Government
  - Mayor (2026–32): Ghislaine Rochaix-Letondeur
- Area^{1}: 23.79 km^{2} (9.19 sq mi)
- Elevation: 853 m (2,799 ft)
- Highest elevation: 1,136 m (3,727 ft)
- Lowest elevation: 831 m (2,726 ft)
- Population (2023): 576
  - Density: 24.2/km^{2} (62.7/sq mi)
- Time zone: UTC+01:00 (CET)
  - Summer (DST): UTC+02:00 (CEST)
- INSEE/Postal code: 01060 /01110
- Website: https://www.brenod.com/
- ^{1} French Land Register data, which excludes lakes, ponds, glaciers > 1 km^{2} (0.386 sq mi or 247 acres) and river estuaries.

Brénod (French pronunciation: [bʁeno]) is a commune in the Ain department in eastern France

== Geography ==
The commune is located 70 km (43 mi) northeast of Lyon.

The river Albarine rises in the commune's northern part, then flows south through the commune; the village lies on the right bank of the river.

== Population ==
Historical population
Year	Pop.	±% p.a.
1968	524	—
1975	436	−2.59%
1982	431	−0.16%
1990	385	−1.40%
1999	427	+1.16%
2007	523	+2.57%
2012	543	+0.75%
2017	509	−1.28%
2023	576	+2.08%
Source: INSEE

== See also ==
- Communes of the Ain department
