= Izenave =

Commune in Auvergne-Rhône-Alpes, France

- Commune
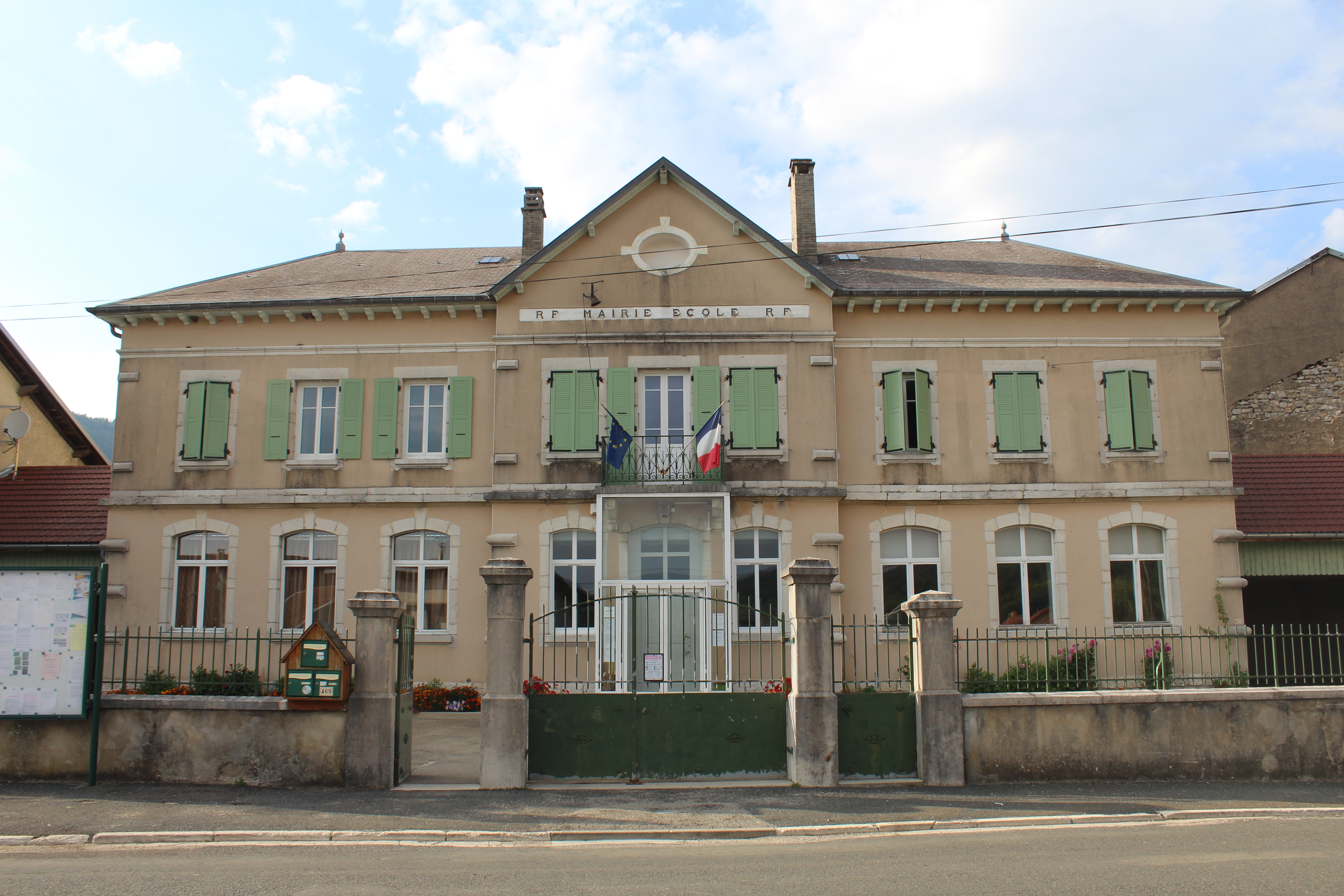
- Town hall

- Coat of arms
- Location of Izenave
- Location within France Location within Auvergne-Rhône-Alpes
- Coordinates: 46°02′20″N 5°31′33″E
- Country: France
- Region: Auvergne-Rhône-Alpes
- Department: Ain
- Arrondissement: Nantua
- Canton: Plateau d'Hauteville
- Intercommunality: Haut-Bugey Agglomération

Government
  - Mayor (2026–32): Thiery Druet
- Area^{1}: 13.04 km^{2} (5.03 sq mi)
- Elevation: 690 m (2,260 ft)
- Highest elevation: 1,008 m (3,307 ft)
- Lowest elevation: 663 m (2,175 ft)
- Population (2023): 162
  - Density: 12.4/km^{2} (32.2/sq mi)
- Time zone: UTC+01:00 (CET)
  - Summer (DST): UTC+02:00 (CEST)
- INSEE/Postal code: 01191 /01430
- ^{1} French Land Register data, which excludes lakes, ponds, glaciers > 1 km^{2} (0.386 sq mi or 247 acres) and river estuaries.

Izenave (French pronunciation: [iznav]) is a commune in the Ain department in eastern France.

== Population ==
Historical population
Year	Pop.	±% p.a.
1968	169	—
1975	138	−2.85%
1982	117	−2.33%
1990	130	+1.33%
1999	146	+1.30%
2007	152	+0.50%
2012	169	+2.14%
2017	156	−1.59%
2023	162	+0.63%
Source: INSEE

== See also ==
- Communes of the Ain department
