= Lantenay, Ain =

Commune in Auvergne-Rhône-Alpes, France

Lantenay
- Commune
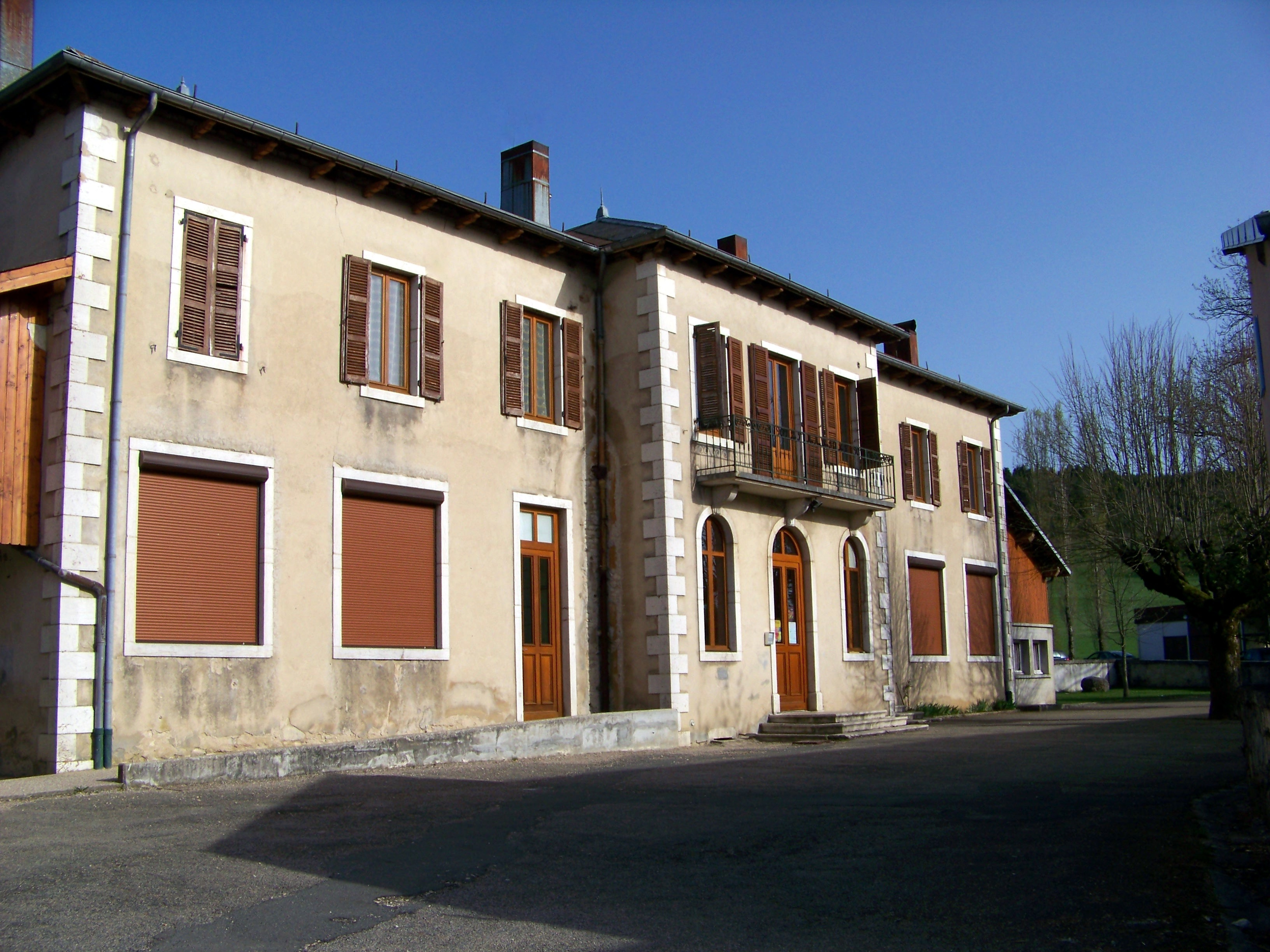
- Town hall
- Location of Lantenay
- Location within France Location within Auvergne-Rhône-Alpes
- Coordinates: 46°03′30″N 5°32′32″E
- Country: France
- Region: Auvergne-Rhône-Alpes
- Department: Ain
- Arrondissement: Nantua
- Canton: Plateau d'Hauteville
- Intercommunality: Haut-Bugey Agglomération

Government
  - Mayor (2026–32): Anthony Pertreux
- Area^{1}: 6.59 km^{2} (2.54 sq mi)
- Elevation: 730 m (2,400 ft)
- Highest elevation: 1,012 m (3,320 ft)
- Lowest elevation: 650 m (2,130 ft)
- Population (2023): 260
  - Density: 39/km^{2} (100/sq mi)
- Time zone: UTC+01:00 (CET)
  - Summer (DST): UTC+02:00 (CEST)
- INSEE/Postal code: 01206 /01430
- ^{1} French Land Register data, which excludes lakes, ponds, glaciers > 1 km^{2} (0.386 sq mi or 247 acres) and river estuaries.

Lantenay (French pronunciation: [lɑ̃tnɛ]) is a commune in the Ain department in eastern France.

== Population ==
Historical population
Year	Pop.	±% p.a.
1968	186	—
1975	176	−0.79%
1982	198	+1.70%
1990	235	+2.16%
1999	260	+1.13%
2007	256	−0.19%
2012	263	+0.54%
2017	277	+1.04%
2023	260	−1.05%
Source: INSEE

== See also ==
- Communes of the Ain department
