= Condamine, Ain =

Commune in Auvergne-Rhône-Alpes, France

Condamine
- Commune
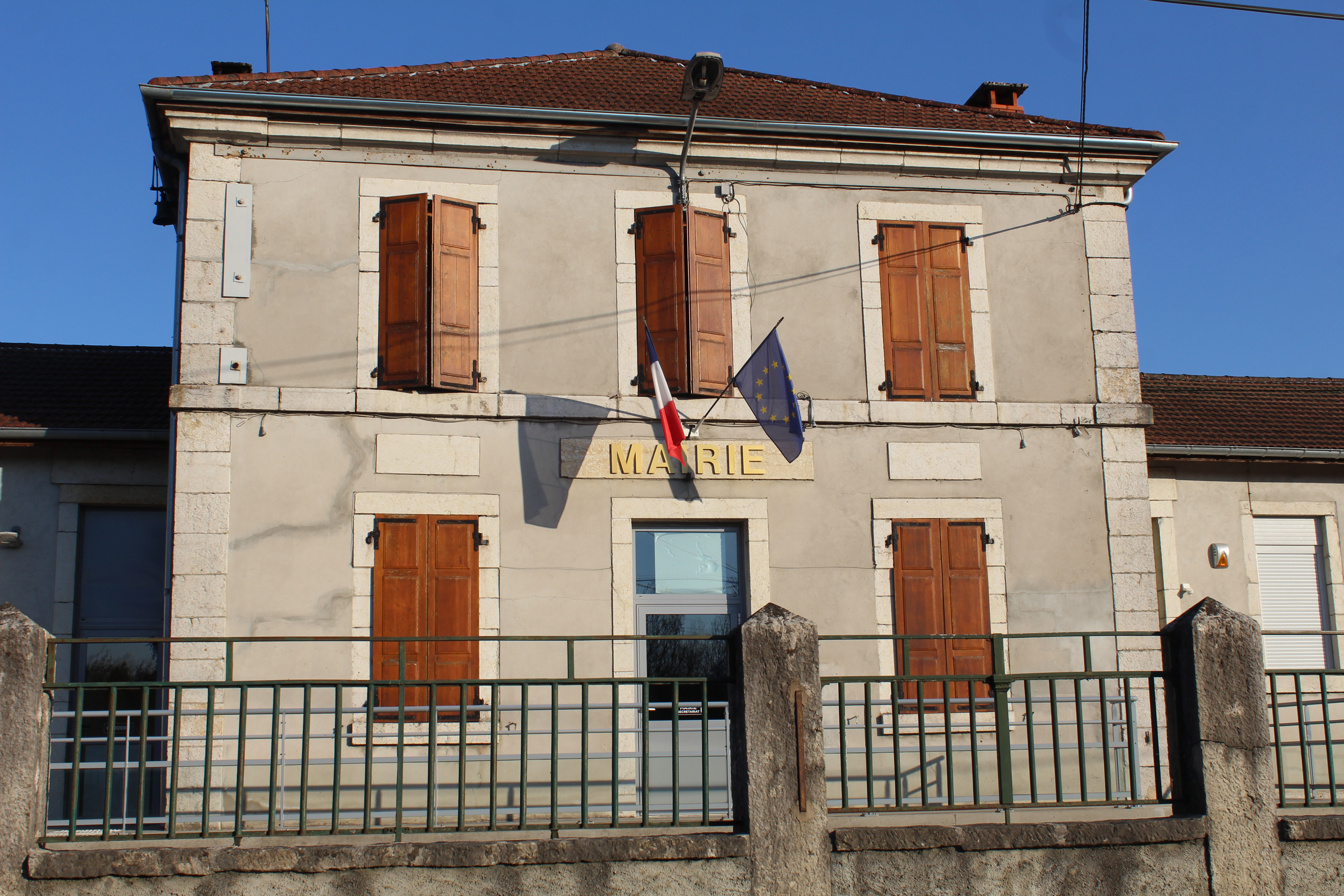
- Town hall
- Location of Condamine
- Location within France Location within Auvergne-Rhône-Alpes
- Coordinates: 46°06′34″N 5°33′05″E
- Country: France
- Region: Auvergne-Rhône-Alpes
- Department: Ain
- Arrondissement: Nantua
- Canton: Plateau d'Hauteville
- Intercommunality: Haut-Bugey Agglomération

Government
  - Mayor (2026–32): Damien Vailloud
- Area^{1}: 4.64 km^{2} (1.79 sq mi)
- Elevation: 550 m (1,800 ft)
- Highest elevation: 808 m (2,651 ft)
- Lowest elevation: 518 m (1,699 ft)
- Population (2023): 480
  - Density: 100/km^{2} (270/sq mi)
- Time zone: UTC+01:00 (CET)
  - Summer (DST): UTC+02:00 (CEST)
- INSEE/Postal code: 01112 /01430
- ^{1} French Land Register data, which excludes lakes, ponds, glaciers > 1 km^{2} (0.386 sq mi or 247 acres) and river estuaries.

Condamine (French pronunciation: [kɔ̃damin]) is a commune in the Ain department in eastern France.

== Population ==
Historical population
Year	Pop.	±% p.a.
1968	182	—
1975	148	−2.91%
1982	194	+3.94%
1990	248	+3.12%
1999	285	+1.56%
2007	380	+3.66%
2012	418	+1.92%
2017	411	−0.34%
2023	480	+2.62%
Source: INSEE

== See also ==
- Communes of the Ain department
