= Canton of Izernore =

Coordinates: 46°13′N 5°33′E

Izernore
- Former canton
- Interactive map of Izernore
- Country: France
- Region: Auvergne-Rhône-Alpes
- Department: Ain
- No. of communes: {{{nbcomm}}}
- Disbanded: 2015
- Area: 128.09 km^{2} (49.46 sq mi)
- Population (2012): 5,804
  - Density: 45.31/km^{2} (117.4/sq mi)

The canton of Izernore is a former administrative division in eastern France. It was disbanded following the French canton reorganisation which came into effect in March 2015. It consisted of 10 communes, which joined the canton of Pont-d'Ain in 2015. It had 5,804 inhabitants (2012).

The canton comprised 10 communes:

- Bolozon
- Ceignes
- Izernore
- Leyssard
- Matafelon-Granges
- Nurieux-Volognat
- Peyriat
- Samognat
- Serrières-sur-Ain
- Sonthonnax-la-Montagne

== Demographics ==
Historical population Canton of Izernore
Year	1962	1968	1975	1982	1990	1999
Pop.	1,898	2,126	2,284	2,908	3,550	4,519
±%	—	+12.0%	+7.4%	+27.3%	+22.1%	+27.3%
From the year 1962 on: No double counting – residents of multiple communes (e.g. students and military personnel) are counted only once. Source: INSEE

== See also ==
- Cantons of the Ain department
- Communes of France
