= Canton of Poncin =

Coordinates: 46°05′15″N 5°24′25″E

Poncin
- Former canton
- Interactive map of Poncin
- Country: France
- Region: Auvergne-Rhône-Alpes
- Department: Ain
- No. of communes: {{{nbcomm}}}
- Disbanded: 2015
- Area: 107.43 km^{2} (41.48 sq mi)
- Population (2012): 7,227
  - Density: 67.27/km^{2} (174.2/sq mi)

The canton of Poncin is a former administrative division in eastern France. It was disbanded following the French canton reorganisation which came into effect in March 2015. It consisted of 9 communes, which joined the canton of Pont-d'Ain in 2015. It had 7,227 inhabitants (2012).

The canton comprised 9 communes:

- Boyeux-Saint-Jérôme
- Cerdon
- Challes-la-Montagne
- Jujurieux
- Labalme
- Mérignat
- Poncin
- Saint-Alban
- Saint-Jean-le-Vieux

== Demographics ==
Historical population Canton of Poncin
Year	1962	1968	1975	1982	1990	1999
Pop.	5,017	5,299	4,914	5,070	5,538	6,041
±%	—	+5.6%	−7.3%	+3.2%	+9.2%	+9.1%
From the year 1962 on: No double counting – residents of multiple communes (e.g. students and military personnel) are counted only once. Source: INSEE

== See also ==
- Cantons of the Ain department
