= Arrondissement of Nantua =

Arrondissement in France

Coordinates: 46°08′23″N 5°35′21″E

Nantua
- Arrondissement
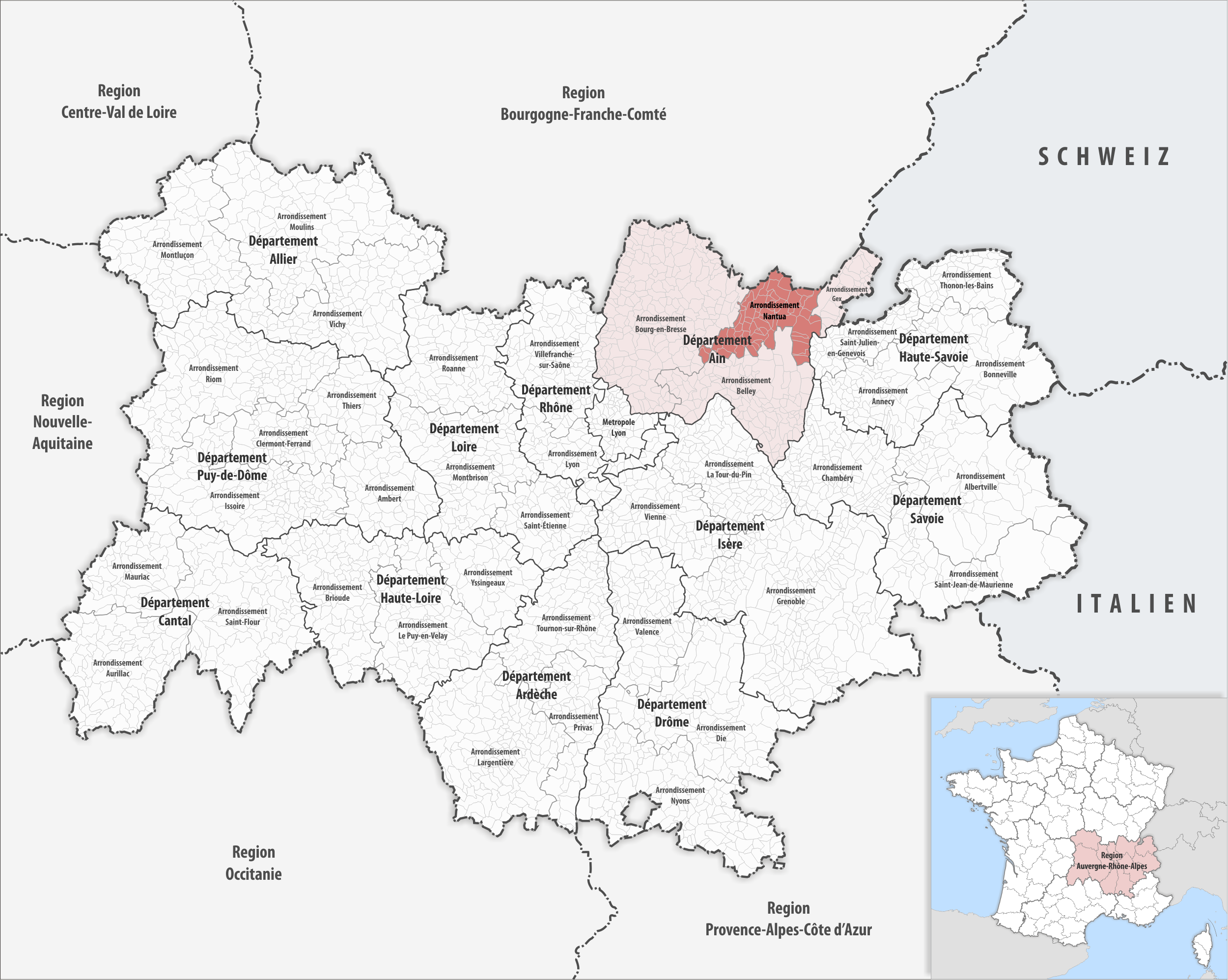
- Location within the region Auvergne-Rhône-Alpes
- Country: France
- Region: Auvergne-Rhône-Alpes
- Department: Ain
- No. of communes: 62
- Area: 899.6 km^{2} (347.3 sq mi)
- Population (2023): 94,996
  - Density: 105.6/km^{2} (273.5/sq mi)
- INSEE code: 014

The arrondissement of Nantua is an arrondissement of France in the Ain department in the Auvergne-Rhône-Alpes region. It has 62 communes. Its population is 93,853 (2021), and its area is 899.6 km^{2} (347.3 sq mi).

== Composition ==
The communes of the arrondissement of Nantua, and their INSEE codes, are:

1. Apremont (01011)
2. Arbent (01014)
3. Béard-Géovreissiat (01170)
4. Belleydoux (01035)
5. Bellignat (01031)
6. Billiat (01044)
7. Bolozon (01051)
8. Boyeux-Saint-Jérôme (01056)
9. Brénod (01060)
10. Brion (01063)
11. Ceignes (01067)
12. Cerdon (01068)
13. Challes-la-Montagne (01077)
14. Champfromier (01081)
15. Chanay (01082)
16. Charix (01087)
17. Chevillard (01101)
18. Condamine (01112)
19. Confort (01114)
20. Dortan (01148)
21. Échallon (01152)
22. Géovreisset (01171)
23. Giron (01174)
24. Groissiat (01181)
25. Injoux-Génissiat (01189)
26. Izenave (01191)
27. Izernore (01192)
28. Jujurieux (01199)
29. Labalme (01200)
30. Lantenay (01206)
31. Leyssard (01214)
32. Maillat (01228)
33. Martignat (01237)
34. Matafelon-Granges (01240)
35. Mérignat (01242)
36. Montanges (01257)
37. Montréal-la-Cluse (01265)
38. Nantua (01269)
39. Neuville-sur-Ain (01273)
40. Les Neyrolles (01274)
41. Nurieux-Volognat (01267)
42. Outriaz (01282)
43. Oyonnax (01283)
44. Peyriat (01293)
45. Plagne (01298)
46. Le Poizat-Lalleyriat (01204)
47. Poncin (01303)
48. Pont-d'Ain (01304)
49. Port (01307)
50. Priay (01314)
51. Saint-Alban (01331)
52. Saint-Germain-de-Joux (01357)
53. Saint-Jean-le-Vieux (01363)
54. Saint-Martin-du-Frêne (01373)
55. Samognat (01392)
56. Serrières-sur-Ain (01404)
57. Sonthonnax-la-Montagne (01410)
58. Surjoux-Lhopital (01215)
59. Valserhône (01033)
60. Varambon (01430)
61. Vieu-d'Izenave (01441)
62. Villes (01448)

== History ==
The arrondissement of Nantua was created in 1800. At the January 2017 reorganization of the arrondissements of Ain, it received four communes from the arrondissement of Bourg-en-Bresse, two from the arrondissement of Gex and one from the arrondissement of Belley, and it lost one commune to the arrondissement of Belley.

As a result of the reorganisation of the cantons of France which came into effect in 2015, the borders of the cantons are no longer related to the borders of the arrondissements. The cantons of the arrondissement of Nantua were, as of January 2015:

1. Bellegarde-sur-Valserine
2. Brénod
3. Izernore
4. Nantua
5. Oyonnax-Nord
6. Oyonnax-Sud
7. Poncin
