= Varambon =

Commune in Auvergne-Rhône-Alpes, France

- Commune
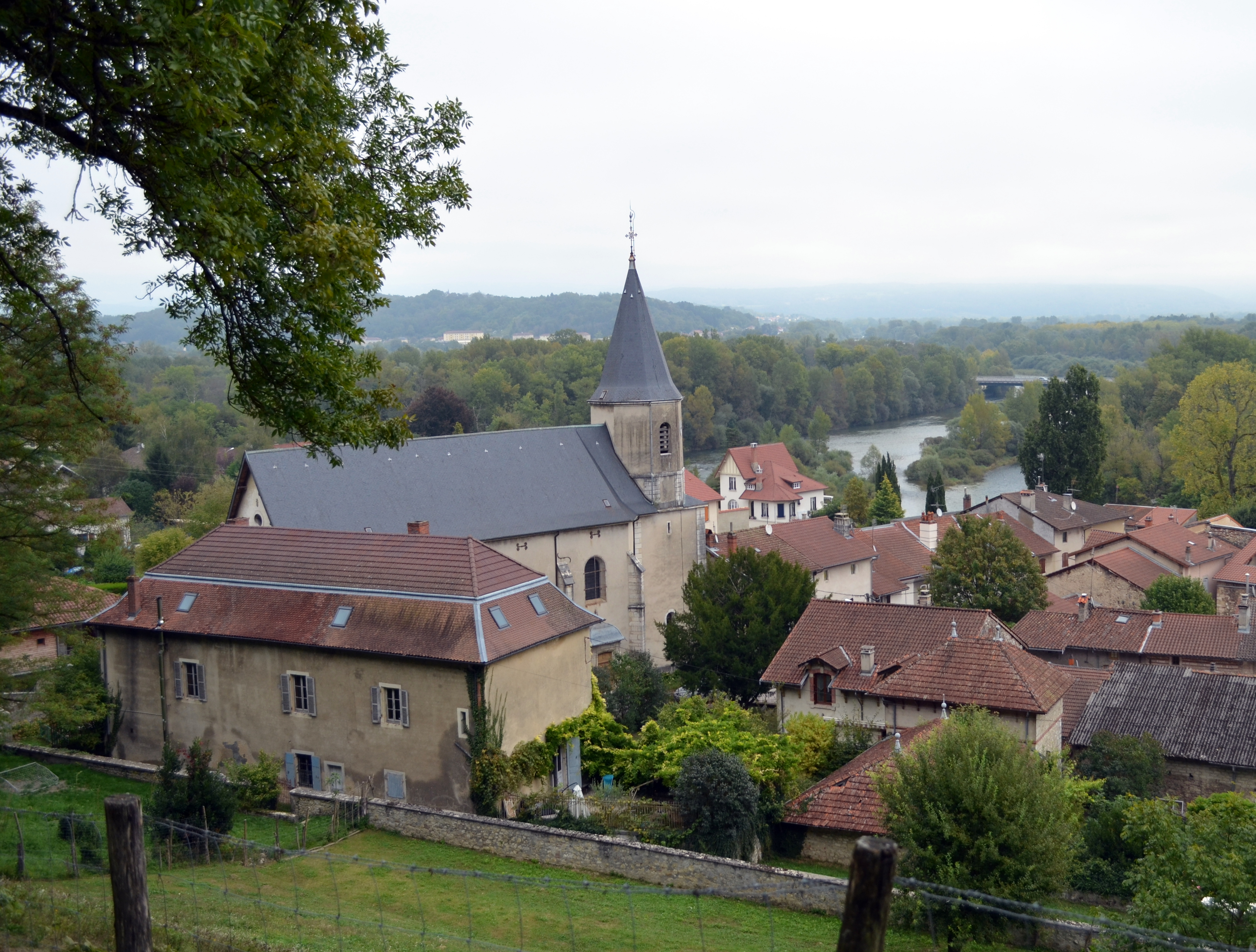
- The 15th-century Église Sainte-Madeleine in Varambon on the River Ain

- Coat of arms
- Location of Varambon
- Location within France Location within Auvergne-Rhône-Alpes
- Coordinates: 46°02′00″N 5°19′00″E
- Country: France
- Region: Auvergne-Rhône-Alpes
- Department: Ain
- Arrondissement: Nantua
- Canton: Pont-d'Ain
- Intercommunality: Rives de l'Ain - Pays du Cerdon

Government
  - Mayor (2026–32): Anne Cholvy
- Area^{1}: 7.99 km^{2} (3.08 sq mi)
- Highest elevation: 347 m (1,138 ft)
- Lowest elevation: 228 m (748 ft)
- Population (2023): 675
  - Density: 84.5/km^{2} (219/sq mi)
- Time zone: UTC+01:00 (CET)
  - Summer (DST): UTC+02:00 (CEST)
- INSEE/Postal code: 01430 /01300
- ^{1} French Land Register data, which excludes lakes, ponds, glaciers > 1 km^{2} (0.386 sq mi or 247 acres) and river estuaries.

Varambon (French pronunciation: [vaʁɑ̃bɔ̃]) is a commune in the central part of the Ain department in the Auvergne-Rhône-Alpes region in Eastern France. It is located just southwest of Pont-d'Ain, northwest of Ambérieu-en-Bugey.

== Demographics ==
Historical population
Year	Pop.	±% p.a.
1968	299	—
1975	287	−0.58%
1982	314	+1.29%
1990	353	+1.47%
1999	385	+0.97%
2007	544	+4.42%
2012	522	−0.82%
2017	584	+2.27%
2023	675	+2.44%
Source: INSEE

== See also ==
- Communes of the Ain department
