= Villes =

Commune in Auvergne-Rhône-Alpes, France

- Commune
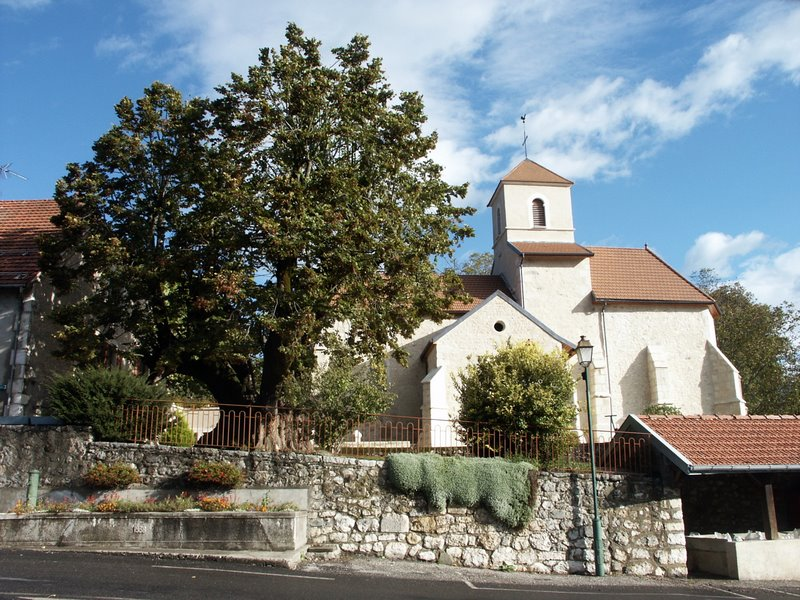
- Location of Villes
- Location within France Location within Auvergne-Rhône-Alpes
- Coordinates: 46°05′21″N 5°47′09″E
- Country: France
- Region: Auvergne-Rhône-Alpes
- Department: Ain
- Arrondissement: Nantua
- Canton: Valserhône
- Intercommunality: Terre Valserhône

Government
  - Mayor (2026–32): Guy Susini
- Area^{1}: 9.60 km^{2} (3.71 sq mi)
- Highest elevation: 1,322 m (4,337 ft)
- Lowest elevation: 445 m (1,460 ft)
- Population (2023): 381
  - Density: 39.7/km^{2} (103/sq mi)
- Time zone: UTC+01:00 (CET)
  - Summer (DST): UTC+02:00 (CEST)
- INSEE/Postal code: 01448 /01200
- ^{1} French Land Register data, which excludes lakes, ponds, glaciers > 1 km^{2} (0.386 sq mi or 247 acres) and river estuaries.

Villes is a commune in the Ain department in eastern France.

== Population ==
Historical population
Year	Pop.	±% p.a.
1968	146	—
1975	157	+1.04%
1982	184	+2.29%
1990	226	+2.60%
1999	268	+1.91%
2007	351	+3.43%
2012	362	+0.62%
2017	376	+0.76%
2023	381	+0.22%
Source: INSEE

== See also ==
- Communes of the Ain department
