= Béard-Géovreissiat =

Commune in Auvergne-Rhône-Alpes, France

- Commune
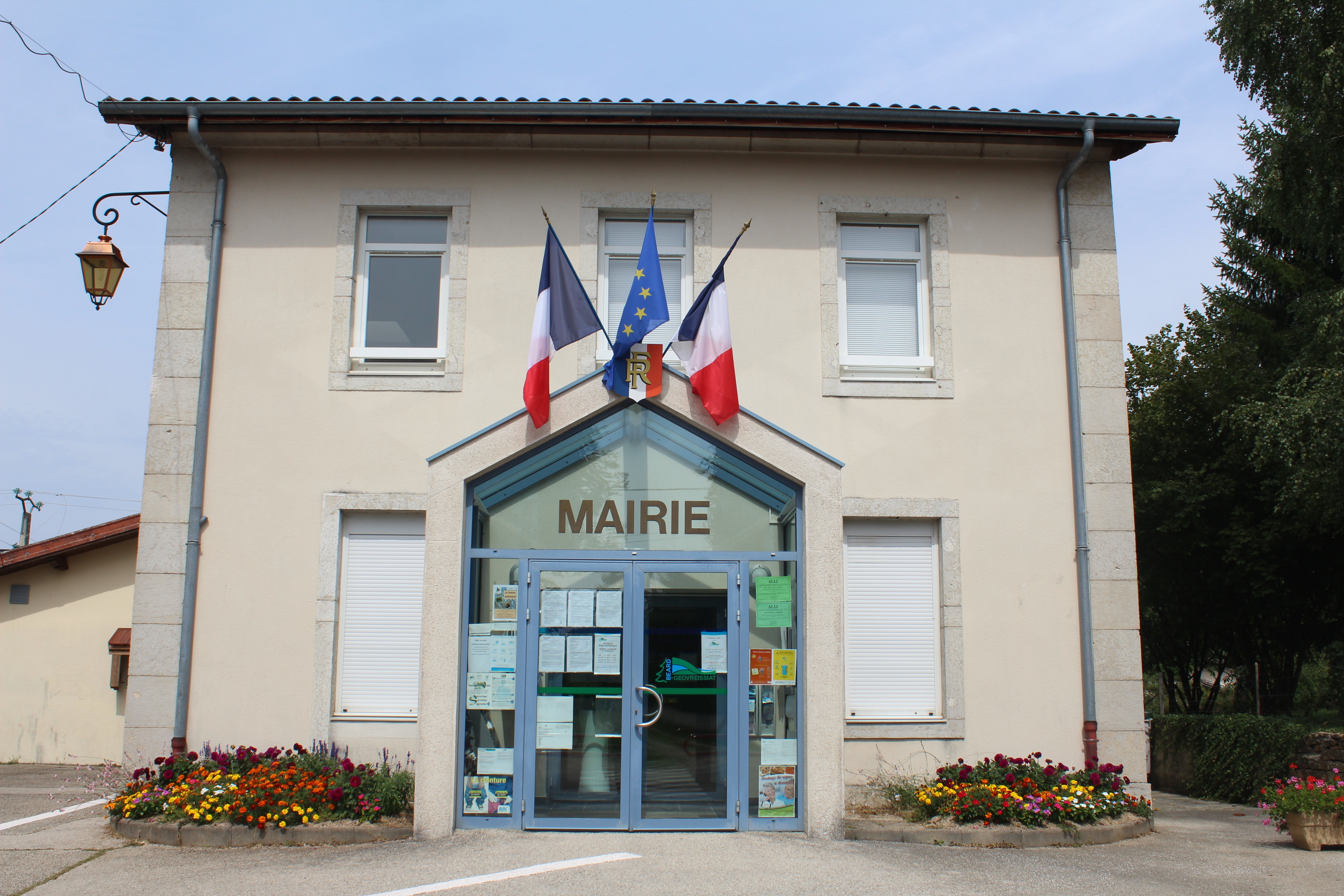
- Town hall
- Location of Béard-Géovreissiat
- Location within France Location within Auvergne-Rhône-Alpes
- Coordinates: 46°11′26″N 5°33′27″E
- Country: France
- Region: Auvergne-Rhône-Alpes
- Department: Ain
- Arrondissement: Nantua
- Canton: Nantua
- Intercommunality: Haut-Bugey Agglomération

Government
  - Mayor (2026–32): Laurent Comtet
- Area^{1}: 4.69 km^{2} (1.81 sq mi)
- Elevation: 500 m (1,600 ft)
- Highest elevation: 724 m (2,375 ft)
- Lowest elevation: 446 m (1,463 ft)
- Population (2023): 1,048
  - Density: 223/km^{2} (579/sq mi)
- Time zone: UTC+01:00 (CET)
  - Summer (DST): UTC+02:00 (CEST)
- INSEE/Postal code: 01170 /01460
- Website: https://www.beard-geovreissiat.fr/
- ^{1} French Land Register data, which excludes lakes, ponds, glaciers > 1 km^{2} (0.386 sq mi or 247 acres) and river estuaries.

Béard-Géovreissiat (French pronunciation: [be.aʁ ʒe.ɔvʁɛsja]) is a commune in the Ain department in eastern France. Prior to 6 October 2008, it was known as Géovreissiat.

== Population ==
Historical population
Year	Pop.	±% p.a.
1968	238	—
1975	279	+2.30%
1982	323	+2.11%
1990	455	+4.38%
1999	714	+5.13%
2007	886	+2.73%
2012	974	+1.91%
2017	1,051	+1.53%
2023	1,048	−0.05%
Source: INSEE

== See also ==
- Communes of the Ain department
