= Canton of Oyonnax-Sud =

Coordinates: 46°15′22″N 5°39′20″E

Oyonnax-Sud
- Former canton
- Interactive map of Oyonnax-Sud
- Country: France
- Region: Auvergne-Rhône-Alpes
- Department: Ain
- No. of communes: {{{nbcomm}}}
- Disbanded: 2015
- Population (2012): 19,038

The canton of Oyonnax-Sud is a former canton (administrative division) in eastern France. It was disbanded following the French canton reorganisation that came into effect in March 2015. It had 19,038 inhabitants (2012).

The canton comprised 5 communes:

- Bellignat
- Géovreisset
- Groissiat
- Martignat
- Oyonnax (partly)

== Demographics ==
Historical population
Year	Pop.	±%
1990	17,801	—
1999	18,831	+5.8%
2012	19,038	+1.1%

== See also ==
- Cantons of the Ain department
