= Charix =

Commune in Auvergne-Rhône-Alpes, France

- Commune
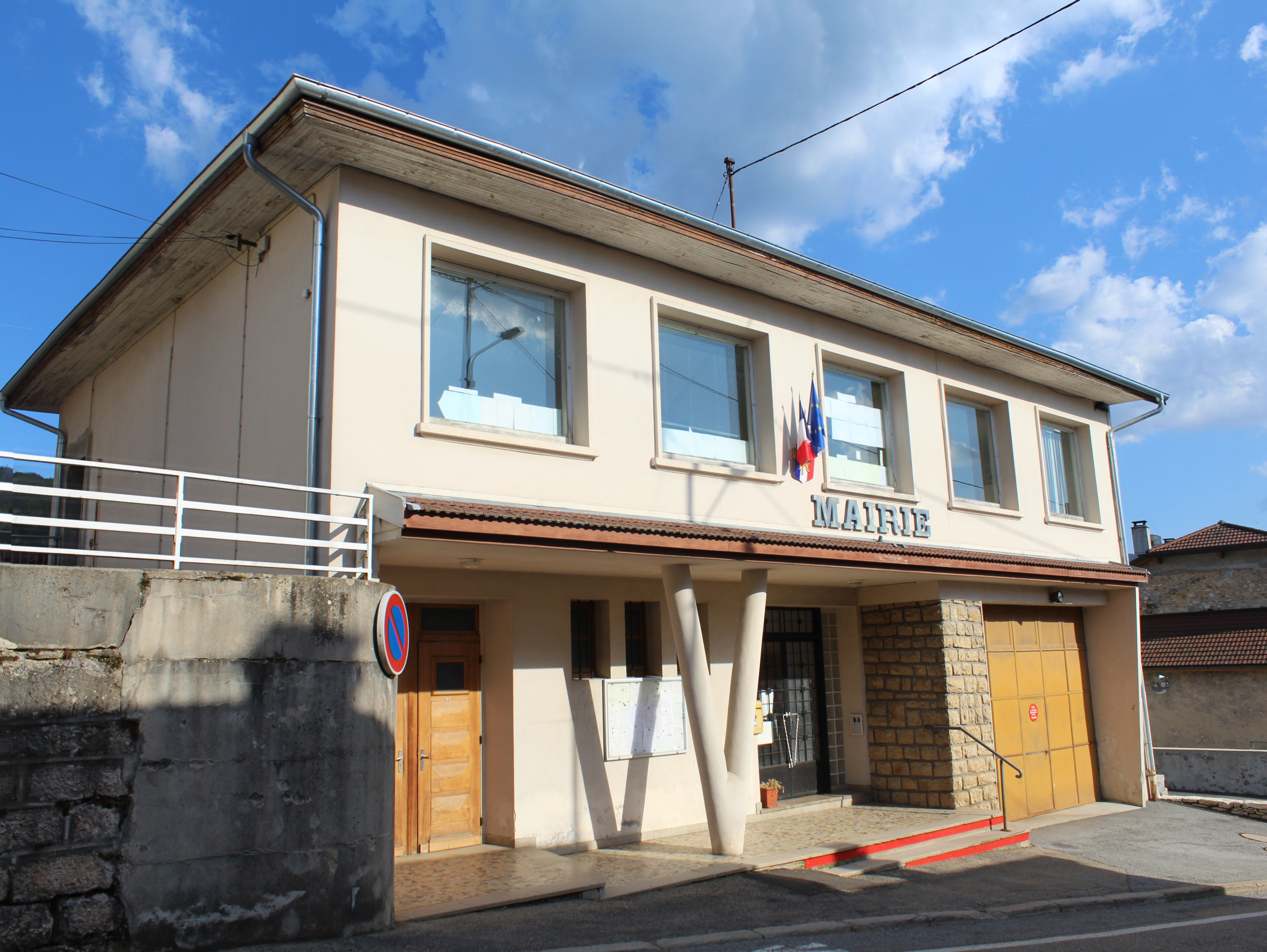
- Town hall
- Location of Charix
- Location within France Location within Auvergne-Rhône-Alpes
- Coordinates: 46°11′03″N 5°41′05″E
- Country: France
- Region: Auvergne-Rhône-Alpes
- Department: Ain
- Arrondissement: Nantua
- Canton: Nantua
- Intercommunality: Haut-Bugey Agglomération

Government
  - Mayor (2026–32): Francis Henriot
- Area^{1}: 18.27 km^{2} (7.05 sq mi)
- Elevation: 780 m (2,560 ft)
- Highest elevation: 1,046 m (3,432 ft)
- Lowest elevation: 580 m (1,900 ft)
- Population (2023): 280
  - Density: 15/km^{2} (40/sq mi)
- Time zone: UTC+01:00 (CET)
  - Summer (DST): UTC+02:00 (CEST)
- INSEE/Postal code: 01087 /01130
- ^{1} French Land Register data, which excludes lakes, ponds, glaciers > 1 km^{2} (0.386 sq mi or 247 acres) and river estuaries.

Charix (French pronunciation: [ʃaʁiks]) is a commune in the Ain department in eastern France.

== Population ==
Historical population
Year	Pop.	±% p.a.
1968	230	—
1975	205	−1.63%
1982	254	+3.11%
1990	261	+0.34%
1999	265	+0.17%
2007	292	+1.22%
2012	283	−0.62%
2017	285	+0.14%
2023	280	−0.29%
Source: INSEE

== See also ==
- Communes of the Ain department
