= Communes of the Ain department =

The following is a list of the 391 communes of the Ain department of France.

The communes cooperate in the following intercommunalities (as of 2025):

- Communauté d'agglomération du Bassin de Bourg-en-Bresse
- Haut-Bugey Agglomération
- Communauté d'agglomération du Pays de Gex
- Mâconnais Beaujolais Agglomération (partly)
- Communauté d'agglomération Villefranche Beaujolais Saône (partly)
- Communauté de communes Bresse et Saône
- Communauté de communes Bugey Sud
- Communauté de communes de la Côtière à Montluel
- Communauté de communes de la Dombes
- Communauté de communes Dombes Saône Vallée
- Communauté de communes de Miribel et du Plateau
- Communauté de communes de la Plaine de l'Ain
- Communauté de communes Rives de l'Ain - Pays du Cerdon
- Communauté de communes Terre Valserhône
- Communauté de communes Usses et Rhône (partly)
- Communauté de communes Val de Saône Centre
- Communauté de communes de la Veyle

== List of communes ==
| INSEE | Postal | Commune |
|---|---|---|
| 01001 | 01400 | L'Abergement-Clémenciat |
| 01002 | 01640 | L'Abergement-de-Varey |
| 01004 | 01500 | Ambérieu-en-Bugey |
| 01005 | 01330 | Ambérieux-en-Dombes |
| 01006 | 01300 | Ambléon |
| 01007 | 01500 | Ambronay |
| 01008 | 01500 | Ambutrix |
| 01009 | 01300 | Andert-et-Condon |
| 01010 | 01350 | Anglefort |
| 01011 | 01100 | Apremont |
| 01012 | 01110 | Aranc |
| 01013 | 01230 | Arandas |
| 01014 | 01100 | Arbent |
| 01016 | 01190 | Arbigny |
| 01015 | 01300 | Arboys-en-Bugey |
| 01017 | 01230 | Argis |
| 01019 | 01510 | Armix |
| 01021 | 01480 | Ars-sur-Formans |
| 01022 | 01510 | Artemare |
| 01453 | 01260 | Arvière-en-Valromey |
| 01023 | 01570 | Asnières-sur-Saône |
| 01024 | 01340 | Attignat |
| 01025 | 01380 | Bâgé-Dommartin |
| 01026 | 01380 | Bâgé-le-Châtel |
| 01027 | 01360 | Balan |
| 01028 | 01990 | Baneins |
| 01029 | 01270 | Beaupont |
| 01030 | 01480 | Beauregard |
| 01032 | 01360 | Béligneux |
| 01034 | 01300 | Belley |
| 01035 | 01130 | Belleydoux |
| 01031 | 01810 | Bellignat |
| 01037 | 01470 | Bénonces |
| 01038 | 01370 | Bény |
| 01040 | 01340 | Béréziat |
| 01041 | 01500 | Bettant |
| 01042 | 01290 | Bey |
| 01043 | 01700 | Beynost |
| 01044 | 01200 | Billiat |
| 01045 | 01330 | Birieux |
| 01046 | 01290 | Biziat |
| 01047 | 01150 | Blyes |
| 01245 | 01250 | Bohas-Meyriat-Rignat |
| 01049 | 01120 | La Boisse |
| 01050 | 01190 | Boissey |
| 01051 | 01450 | Bolozon |
| 01052 | 01330 | Bouligneux |
| 01053 | 01000 | Bourg-en-Bresse |
| 01054 | 01800 | Bourg-Saint-Christophe |
| 01056 | 01640 | Boyeux-Saint-Jérôme |
| 01057 | 01190 | Boz |
| 01058 | 01300 | Brégnier-Cordon |
| 01060 | 01110 | Brénod |
| 01061 | 01300 | Brens |
| 01130 | 01340 | Bresse Vallons |
| 01062 | 01360 | Bressolles |
| 01063 | 01460 | Brion |
| 01064 | 01470 | Briord |
| 01065 | 01310 | Buellas |
| 01066 | 01510 | La Burbanche |
| 01067 | 01430 | Ceignes |
| 01068 | 01450 | Cerdon |
| 01069 | 01240 | Certines |
| 01071 | 01170 | Cessy |
| 01072 | 01250 | Ceyzériat |
| 01073 | 01350 | Ceyzérieu |
| 01074 | 01320 | Chalamont |
| 01075 | 01480 | Chaleins |
| 01076 | 01230 | Chaley |
| 01077 | 01450 | Challes-la-Montagne |
| 01078 | 01630 | Challex |
| 01079 | 01260 | Champagne-en-Valromey |
| 01080 | 01110 | Champdor-Corcelles |
| 01081 | 01410 | Champfromier |
| 01082 | 01420 | Chanay |
| 01083 | 01990 | Chaneins |
| 01084 | 01400 | Chanoz-Châtenay |
| 01085 | 01240 | La Chapelle-du-Châtelard |
| 01087 | 01130 | Charix |
| 01088 | 01800 | Charnoz-sur-Ain |
| 01089 | 01500 | Château-Gaillard |
| 01090 | 01320 | Châtenay |
| 01092 | 01320 | Châtillon-la-Palud |
| 01093 | 01400 | Châtillon-sur-Chalaronne |
| 01094 | 01190 | Chavannes-sur-Reyssouze |
| 01096 | 01660 | Chaveyriat |
| 01098 | 01300 | Chazey-Bons |
| 01099 | 01150 | Chazey-sur-Ain |
| 01100 | 01510 | Cheignieu-la-Balme |
| 01101 | 01430 | Chevillard |
| 01102 | 01190 | Chevroux |
| 01103 | 01170 | Chevry |
| 01104 | 01410 | Chézery-Forens |
| 01105 | 01390 | Civrieux |
| 01106 | 01250 | Cize |
| 01107 | 01230 | Cleyzieu |
| 01108 | 01270 | Coligny |
| 01109 | 01550 | Collonges |
| 01110 | 01300 | Colomieu |
| 01111 | 01230 | Conand |
| 01112 | 01430 | Condamine |
| 01113 | 01400 | Condeissiat |
| 01114 | 01200 | Confort |
| 01115 | 01310 | Confrançon |
| 01116 | 01300 | Contrevoz |
| 01117 | 01300 | Conzieu |
| 01118 | 01420 | Corbonod |
| 01121 | 01110 | Corlier |
| 01123 | 01290 | Cormoranche-sur-Saône |
| 01124 | 01560 | Cormoz |
| 01125 | 01250 | Corveissiat |
| 01127 | 01370 | Courmangoux |
| 01128 | 01560 | Courtes |
| 01129 | 01320 | Crans |
| 01133 | 01350 | Cressin-Rochefort |
| 01134 | 01290 | Crottet |
| 01135 | 01170 | Crozet |
| 01136 | 01290 | Cruzilles-lès-Mépillat |
| 01138 | 01350 | Culoz-Béon |
| 01139 | 01560 | Curciat-Dongalon |
| 01140 | 01310 | Curtafond |
| 01141 | 01300 | Cuzieu |
| 01142 | 01120 | Dagneux |
| 01143 | 01220 | Divonne-les-Bains |
| 01146 | 01400 | Dompierre-sur-Chalaronne |
| 01145 | 01240 | Dompierre-sur-Veyle |
| 01147 | 01270 | Domsure |
| 01148 | 01590 | Dortan |
| 01149 | 01500 | Douvres |
| 01150 | 01250 | Drom |
| 01151 | 01160 | Druillat |
| 01152 | 01130 | Échallon |
| 01153 | 01170 | Échenevex |
| 01155 | 01230 | Évosges |
| 01156 | 01800 | Faramans |
| 01157 | 01480 | Fareins |
| 01158 | 01550 | Farges |
| 01159 | 01570 | Feillens |
| 01160 | 01210 | Ferney-Voltaire |
| 01162 | 01350 | Flaxieu |
| 01163 | 01340 | Foissiat |
| 01165 | 01090 | Francheleins |
| 01166 | 01480 | Frans |
| 01167 | 01140 | Garnerans |
| 01169 | 01090 | Genouilleux |
| 01171 | 01100 | Géovreisset |
| 01170 | 01460 | Béard-Géovreissiat |
| 01173 | 01170 | Gex |
| 01174 | 01130 | Giron |
| 01175 | 01190 | Gorrevod |
| 01177 | 01250 | Grand-Corent |
| 01179 | 01290 | Grièges |
| 01180 | 01220 | Grilly |
| 01181 | 01810 | Groissiat |
| 01338 | 01300 | Groslée-Saint-Benoît |
| 01183 | 01090 | Guéreins |
| 01184 | 01250 | Hautecourt-Romanèche |
| 01187 | 01260 | Haut-Valromey |
| 01188 | 01140 | Illiat |
| 01189 | 01200 | Injoux-Génissiat |
| 01190 | 01680 | Innimond |
| 01191 | 01430 | Izenave |
| 01192 | 01580 | Izernore |
| 01193 | 01300 | Izieu |
| 01194 | 01480 | Jassans-Riottier |
| 01195 | 01250 | Jasseron |
| 01196 | 01340 | Jayat |
| 01197 | 01250 | Journans |
| 01198 | 01800 | Joyeux |
| 01199 | 01640 | Jujurieux |
| 01200 | 01450 | Labalme |
| 01202 | 01150 | Lagnieu |
| 01203 | 01290 | Laiz |
| 01206 | 01430 | Lantenay |
| 01207 | 01330 | Lapeyrouse |
| 01208 | 01350 | Lavours |
| 01209 | 01200 | Léaz |
| 01210 | 01410 | Lélex |
| 01211 | 01240 | Lent |
| 01212 | 01560 | Lescheroux |
| 01213 | 01150 | Leyment |
| 01214 | 01450 | Leyssard |
| 01216 | 01680 | Lhuis |
| 01219 | 01680 | Lompnas |
| 01224 | 01360 | Loyettes |
| 01225 | 01090 | Lurcy |
| 01227 | 01300 | Magnieu |
| 01228 | 01430 | Maillat |
| 01229 | 01340 | Malafretaz |
| 01230 | 01560 | Mantenay-Montlin |
| 01231 | 01570 | Manziat |

| INSEE | Postal | Commune |
|---|---|---|
| 01232 | 01851 | Marboz |
| 01233 | 01680 | Marchamp |
| 01234 | 01300 | Marignieu |
| 01235 | 01240 | Marlieux |
| 01236 | 01340 | Marsonnas |
| 01237 | 01810 | Martignat |
| 01238 | 01600 | Massieux |
| 01239 | 01300 | Massignieu-de-Rives |
| 01240 | 01580 | Matafelon-Granges |
| 01241 | 01370 | Meillonnas |
| 01242 | 01450 | Mérignat |
| 01243 | 01480 | Messimy-sur-Saône |
| 01244 | 01800 | Meximieux |
| 01246 | 01660 | Mézériat |
| 01247 | 01410 | Mijoux |
| 01248 | 01390 | Mionnay |
| 01249 | 01700 | Miribel |
| 01250 | 01600 | Misérieux |
| 01252 | 01140 | Mogneneins |
| 01254 | 01250 | Montagnat |
| 01255 | 01470 | Montagnieu |
| 01257 | 01200 | Montanges |
| 01258 | 01090 | Montceaux |
| 01259 | 01310 | Montcet |
| 01260 | 01800 | Le Montellier |
| 01261 | 01390 | Monthieux |
| 01262 | 01120 | Montluel |
| 01263 | 01090 | Montmerle-sur-Saône |
| 01264 | 01310 | Montracol |
| 01265 | 01460 | Montréal-la-Cluse |
| 01266 | 01340 | Montrevel-en-Bresse |
| 01268 | 01300 | Murs-et-Gélignieux |
| 01269 | 01460 | Nantua |
| 01272 | 01400 | Neuville-les-Dames |
| 01273 | 01160 | Neuville-sur-Ain |
| 01274 | 01130 | Les Neyrolles |
| 01275 | 01700 | Neyron |
| 01276 | 01120 | Niévroz |
| 01095 | 01250 | Nivigne et Suran |
| 01277 | 01230 | Nivollet-Montgriffon |
| 01267 | 01460 | Nurieux-Volognat |
| 01279 | 01230 | Oncieu |
| 01280 | 01510 | Ordonnaz |
| 01281 | 01210 | Ornex |
| 01282 | 01430 | Outriaz |
| 01283 | 01100 | Oyonnax |
| 01284 | 01190 | Ozan |
| 01285 | 01600 | Parcieux |
| 01286 | 01300 | Parves-et-Nattages |
| 01288 | 01630 | Péron |
| 01289 | 01960 | Péronnas |
| 01290 | 01800 | Pérouges |
| 01291 | 01540 | Perrex |
| 01293 | 01430 | Peyriat |
| 01294 | 01300 | Peyrieu |
| 01295 | 01140 | Peyzieux-sur-Saône |
| 01296 | 01270 | Pirajoux |
| 01297 | 01120 | Pizay |
| 01298 | 01130 | Plagne |
| 01299 | 01330 | Le Plantay |
| 01185 | 01110 | Plateau d'Hauteville |
| 01204 | 01130 | Le Poizat-Lalleyriat |
| 01301 | 01310 | Polliat |
| 01302 | 01350 | Pollieu |
| 01303 | 01450 | Poncin |
| 01304 | 01160 | Pont-d'Ain |
| 01305 | 01190 | Pont-de-Vaux |
| 01306 | 01290 | Pont-de-Veyle |
| 01307 | 01460 | Port |
| 01308 | 01550 | Pougny |
| 01309 | 01250 | Pouillat |
| 01310 | 01300 | Prémeyzel |
| 01311 | 01110 | Prémillieu |
| 01313 | 01280 | Prévessin-Moëns |
| 01314 | 01160 | Priay |
| 01317 | 01250 | Ramasse |
| 01318 | 01390 | Rancé |
| 01319 | 01990 | Relevant |
| 01320 | 01750 | Replonges |
| 01321 | 01250 | Revonnas |
| 01322 | 01600 | Reyrieux |
| 01323 | 01190 | Reyssouze |
| 01325 | 01800 | Rignieux-le-Franc |
| 01328 | 01400 | Romans |
| 01329 | 01510 | Rossillon |
| 01331 | 01450 | Saint-Alban |
| 01332 | 01380 | Saint-André-de-Bâgé |
| 01333 | 01390 | Saint-André-de-Corcy |
| 01334 | 01290 | Saint-André-d'Huiriat |
| 01335 | 01240 | Saint-André-le-Bouchoux |
| 01336 | 01960 | Saint-André-sur-Vieux-Jonc |
| 01337 | 01190 | Saint-Bénigne |
| 01339 | 01600 | Saint-Bernard |
| 01343 | 01380 | Saint-Cyr-sur-Menthon |
| 01345 | 01500 | Saint-Denis-en-Bugey |
| 01344 | 01000 | Saint-Denis-lès-Bourg |
| 01346 | 01340 | Saint-Didier-d'Aussiat |
| 01347 | 01600 | Saint-Didier-de-Formans |
| 01348 | 01140 | Saint-Didier-sur-Chalaronne |
| 01342 | 01120 | Sainte-Croix |
| 01353 | 01600 | Sainte-Euphémie |
| 01366 | 01150 | Sainte-Julie |
| 01349 | 01800 | Saint-Éloi |
| 01382 | 01330 | Sainte-Olive |
| 01350 | 01370 | Saint-Étienne-du-Bois |
| 01351 | 01140 | Saint-Étienne-sur-Chalaronne |
| 01352 | 01190 | Saint-Étienne-sur-Reyssouze |
| 01354 | 01630 | Saint-Genis-Pouilly |
| 01355 | 01380 | Saint-Genis-sur-Menthon |
| 01356 | 01400 | Saint-Georges-sur-Renon |
| 01357 | 01130 | Saint-Germain-de-Joux |
| 01358 | 01300 | Saint-Germain-les-Paroisses |
| 01359 | 01240 | Saint-Germain-sur-Renon |
| 01360 | 01630 | Saint-Jean-de-Gonville |
| 01361 | 01800 | Saint-Jean-de-Niost |
| 01362 | 01390 | Saint-Jean-de-Thurigneux |
| 01363 | 01640 | Saint-Jean-le-Vieux |
| 01364 | 01560 | Saint-Jean-sur-Reyssouze |
| 01365 | 01290 | Saint-Jean-sur-Veyle |
| 01367 | 01560 | Saint-Julien-sur-Reyssouze |
| 01368 | 01540 | Saint-Julien-sur-Veyle |
| 01369 | 01250 | Saint-Just |
| 01370 | 01750 | Saint-Laurent-sur-Saône |
| 01371 | 01390 | Saint-Marcel |
| 01372 | 01510 | Saint-Martin-de-Bavel |
| 01373 | 01430 | Saint-Martin-du-Frêne |
| 01374 | 01160 | Saint-Martin-du-Mont |
| 01375 | 01310 | Saint-Martin-le-Châtel |
| 01376 | 01700 | Saint-Maurice-de-Beynost |
| 01378 | 01800 | Saint-Maurice-de-Gourdans |
| 01379 | 01500 | Saint-Maurice-de-Rémens |
| 01380 | 01560 | Saint-Nizier-le-Bouchoux |
| 01381 | 01320 | Saint-Nizier-le-Désert |
| 01383 | 01240 | Saint-Paul-de-Varax |
| 01384 | 01230 | Saint-Rambert-en-Bugey |
| 01385 | 01310 | Saint-Rémy |
| 01386 | 01150 | Saint-Sorlin-en-Bugey |
| 01387 | 01340 | Saint-Sulpice |
| 01388 | 01560 | Saint-Trivier-de-Courtes |
| 01389 | 01990 | Saint-Trivier-sur-Moignans |
| 01390 | 01150 | Saint-Vulbas |
| 01391 | 01270 | Salavre |
| 01392 | 01580 | Samognat |
| 01393 | 01400 | Sandrans |
| 01396 | 01150 | Sault-Brénaz |
| 01397 | 01220 | Sauverny |
| 01398 | 01480 | Savigneux |
| 01399 | 01170 | Ségny |
| 01400 | 01470 | Seillonnaz |
| 01401 | 01630 | Sergy |
| 01402 | 01190 | Sermoyer |
| 01403 | 01470 | Serrières-de-Briord |
| 01404 | 01450 | Serrières-sur-Ain |
| 01405 | 01960 | Servas |
| 01406 | 01560 | Servignat |
| 01407 | 01420 | Seyssel |
| 01408 | 01250 | Simandre-sur-Suran |
| 01410 | 01580 | Sonthonnax-la-Montagne |
| 01411 | 01150 | Souclin |
| 01412 | 01400 | Sulignat |
| 01215 | 01420 | Surjoux-Lhopital |
| 01415 | 01510 | Talissieu |
| 01416 | 01230 | Tenay |
| 01418 | 01120 | Thil |
| 01419 | 01710 | Thoiry |
| 01420 | 01140 | Thoissey |
| 01421 | 01230 | Torcieu |
| 01422 | 01250 | Tossiat |
| 01423 | 01600 | Toussieux |
| 01424 | 01390 | Tramoyes |
| 01425 | 01160 | La Tranclière |
| 01427 | 01600 | Trévoux |
| 01428 | 01140 | Valeins |
| 01426 | 01370 | Val-Revermont |
| 01036 | 01260 | Valromey-sur-Séran |
| 01033 | 01200 | Valserhône |
| 01429 | 01660 | Vandeins |
| 01430 | 01160 | Varambon |
| 01431 | 01150 | Vaux-en-Bugey |
| 01432 | 01270 | Verjon |
| 01433 | 01560 | Vernoux |
| 01434 | 01330 | Versailleux |
| 01435 | 01210 | Versonnex |
| 01436 | 01170 | Vesancy |
| 01437 | 01560 | Vescours |
| 01439 | 01570 | Vésines |
| 01441 | 01430 | Vieu-d'Izenave |
| 01443 | 01330 | Villars-les-Dombes |
| 01444 | 01150 | Villebois |
| 01445 | 01270 | Villemotier |
| 01446 | 01480 | Villeneuve |
| 01447 | 01250 | Villereversure |
| 01448 | 01200 | Villes |
| 01449 | 01320 | Villette-sur-Ain |
| 01450 | 01800 | Villieu-Loyes-Mollon |
| 01451 | 01440 | Viriat |
| 01452 | 01510 | Virieu-le-Grand |
| 01454 | 01300 | Virignin |
| 01456 | 01350 | Vongnes |
| 01457 | 01540 | Vonnas |
