= Champfromier =

Commune in Auvergne-Rhône-Alpes, France

- Commune
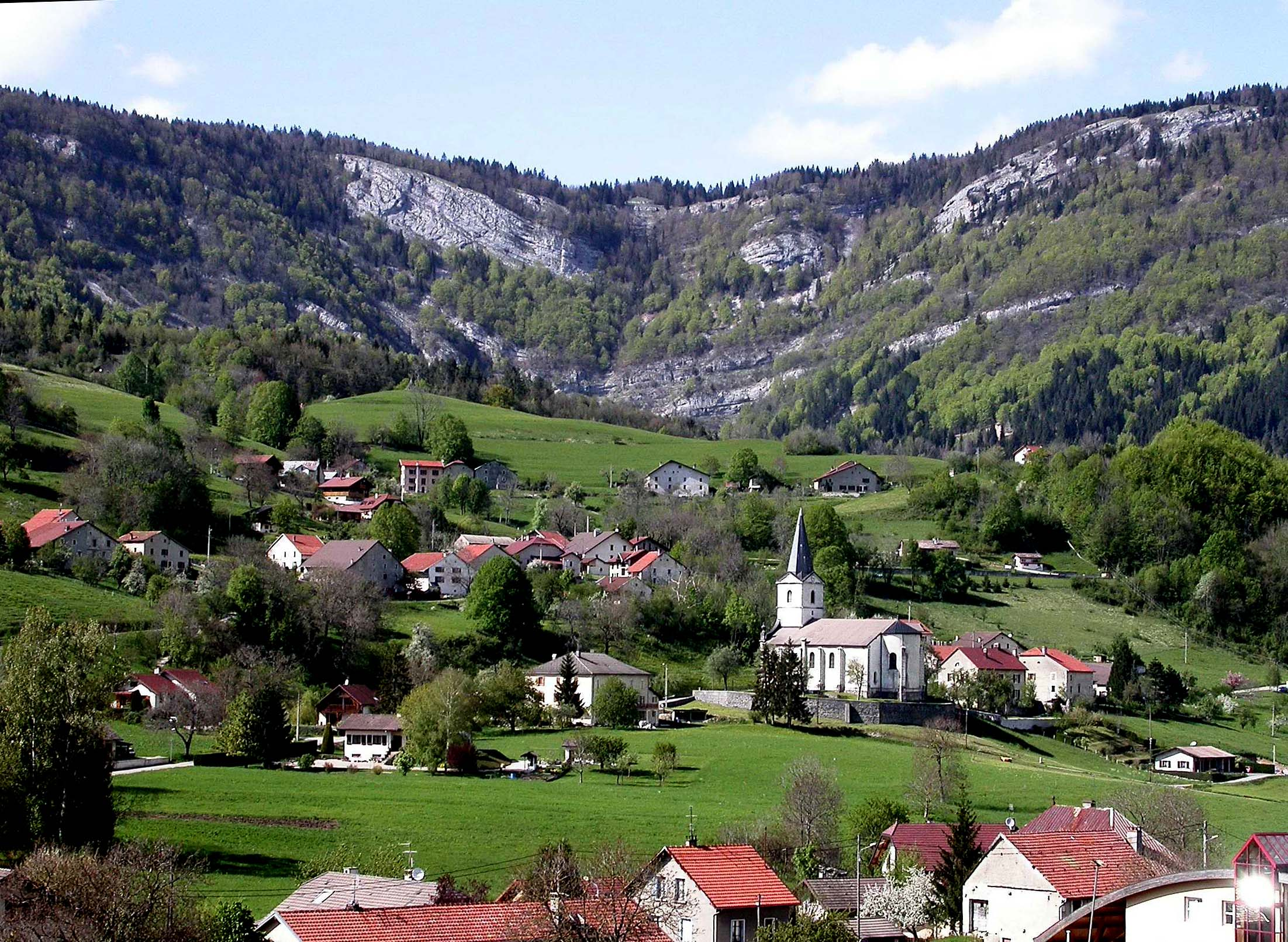
- Location of Champfromier
- Location within France Location within Auvergne-Rhône-Alpes
- Coordinates: 46°12′00″N 5°49′00″E
- Country: France
- Region: Auvergne-Rhône-Alpes
- Department: Ain
- Arrondissement: Nantua
- Canton: Valserhône
- Intercommunality: Terre Valserhône

Government
  - Mayor (2026–32): Jacques Vialon
- Area^{1}: 32.40 km^{2} (12.51 sq mi)
- Elevation: 646 m (2,119 ft)
- Highest elevation: 1,540 m (5,050 ft)
- Lowest elevation: 480 m (1,570 ft)
- Population (2023): 725
  - Density: 22.4/km^{2} (58.0/sq mi)
- Time zone: UTC+01:00 (CET)
  - Summer (DST): UTC+02:00 (CEST)
- INSEE/Postal code: 01081 /01410
- ^{1} French Land Register data, which excludes lakes, ponds, glaciers > 1 km^{2} (0.386 sq mi or 247 acres) and river estuaries.

Champfromier (French pronunciation: [ʃɑ̃fʁɔmje]) is a commune in the Ain department in eastern France.

== Population ==
Historical population
Year	Pop.	±% p.a.
1968	428	—
1975	326	−3.81%
1982	332	+0.26%
1990	440	+3.58%
1999	593	+3.37%
2007	630	+0.76%
2012	696	+2.01%
2017	729	+0.93%
2023	725	−0.09%
Source: INSEE

== See also ==
- Communes of the Ain department
