= Boyeux-Saint-Jérôme =

Commune in Auvergne-Rhône-Alpes, France

- Commune
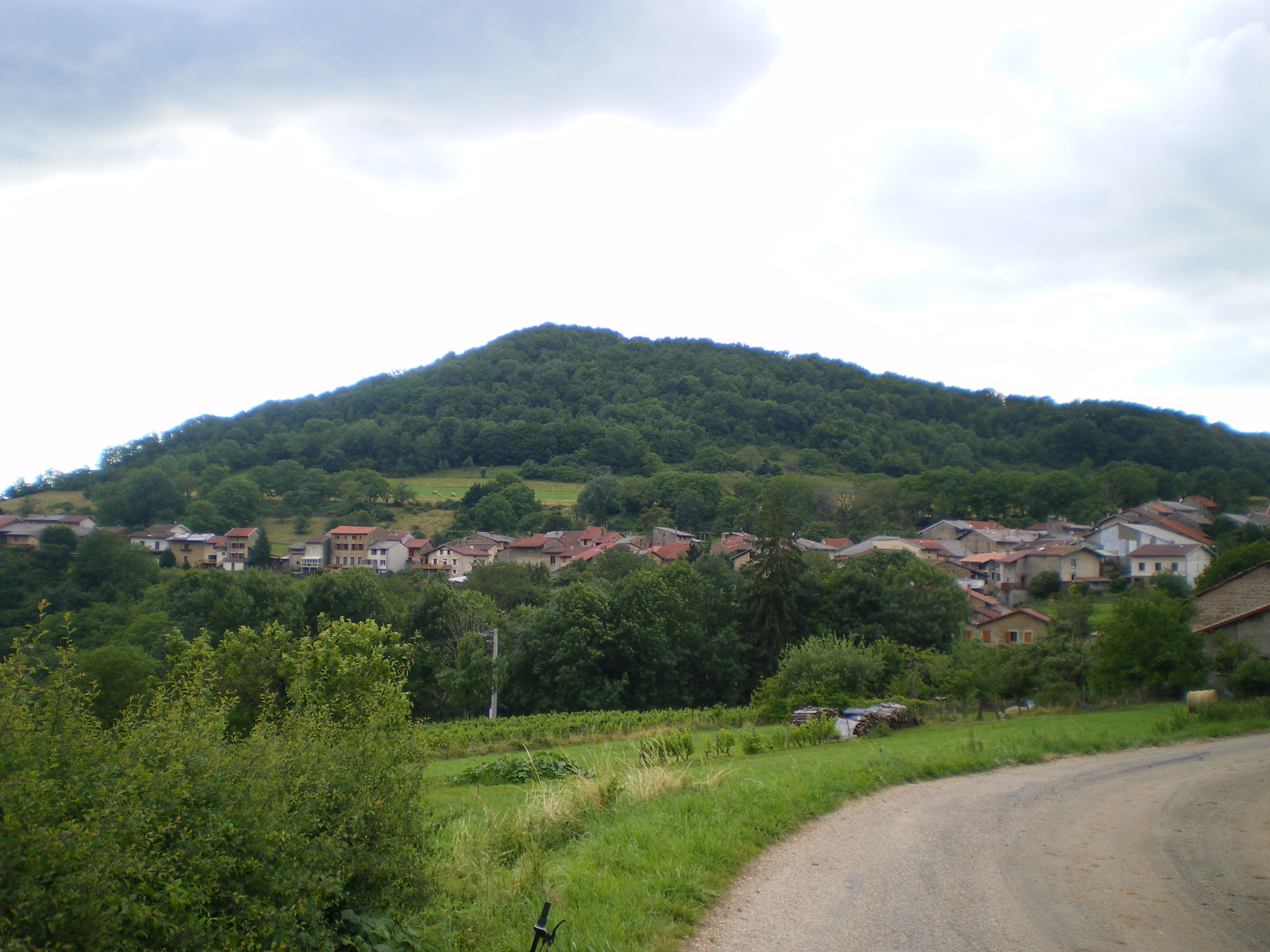
- Location of Boyeux-Saint-Jérôme
- Location within France Location within Auvergne-Rhône-Alpes
- Coordinates: 46°01′50″N 5°27′26″E
- Country: France
- Region: Auvergne-Rhône-Alpes
- Department: Ain
- Arrondissement: Nantua
- Canton: Pont-d'Ain
- Intercommunality: Rives de l'Ain - Pays du Cerdon

Government
  - Mayor (2026–32): Juvénal Turpin
- Area^{1}: 16.94 km^{2} (6.54 sq mi)
- Elevation: 540 m (1,770 ft)
- Highest elevation: 900 m (3,000 ft)
- Lowest elevation: 329 m (1,079 ft)
- Population (2023): 367
  - Density: 21.7/km^{2} (56.1/sq mi)
- Time zone: UTC+01:00 (CET)
  - Summer (DST): UTC+02:00 (CEST)
- INSEE/Postal code: 01056 /01640
- Website: https://www.boyeuxsaintjerome.fr/
- ^{1} French Land Register data, which excludes lakes, ponds, glaciers > 1 km^{2} (0.386 sq mi or 247 acres) and river estuaries.

Boyeux-Saint-Jérôme (French pronunciation: [bwajø sɛ̃ ʒeʁom]) is a commune in the Ain department in eastern France.

== Population ==
Historical population
Year	Pop.	±% p.a.
1968	225	—
1975	212	−0.85%
1982	254	+2.62%
1990	241	−0.65%
1999	277	+1.56%
2007	309	+1.38%
2012	358	+2.99%
2017	346	−0.68%
2023	367	+0.99%
Source: INSEE

== See also ==
- Communes of the Ain department
