= Peyriat =

Commune in Auvergne-Rhône-Alpes, France

- Commune
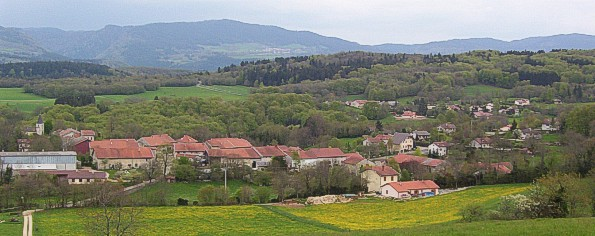
- Location of Peyriat
- Location within France Location within Auvergne-Rhône-Alpes
- Coordinates: 46°09′18″N 5°30′40″E
- Country: France
- Region: Auvergne-Rhône-Alpes
- Department: Ain
- Arrondissement: Nantua
- Canton: Pont-d'Ain
- Intercommunality: Haut-Bugey Agglomération

Government
  - Mayor (2026–32): Sylvain Guenro
- Area^{1}: 5.93 km^{2} (2.29 sq mi)
- Elevation: 630 m (2,070 ft)
- Highest elevation: 815 m (2,674 ft)
- Lowest elevation: 557 m (1,827 ft)
- Population (2023): 153
  - Density: 25.8/km^{2} (66.8/sq mi)
- Time zone: UTC+01:00 (CET)
  - Summer (DST): UTC+02:00 (CEST)
- INSEE/Postal code: 01293 /01430
- ^{1} French Land Register data, which excludes lakes, ponds, glaciers > 1 km^{2} (0.386 sq mi or 247 acres) and river estuaries.

Peyriat (French pronunciation: [pɛʁja]) is a commune in the Ain department in eastern France.

== Population ==
Historical population
Year	Pop.	±% p.a.
1968	85	—
1975	87	+0.33%
1982	120	+4.70%
1990	154	+3.17%
1999	158	+0.29%
2007	166	+0.62%
2012	174	+0.95%
2017	157	−2.04%
2023	153	−0.43%
Source: INSEE

== See also ==
- Communes of the Ain department
