= Cerdon, Ain =

Commune in Auvergne-Rhône-Alpes, France

Cerdon
- Commune
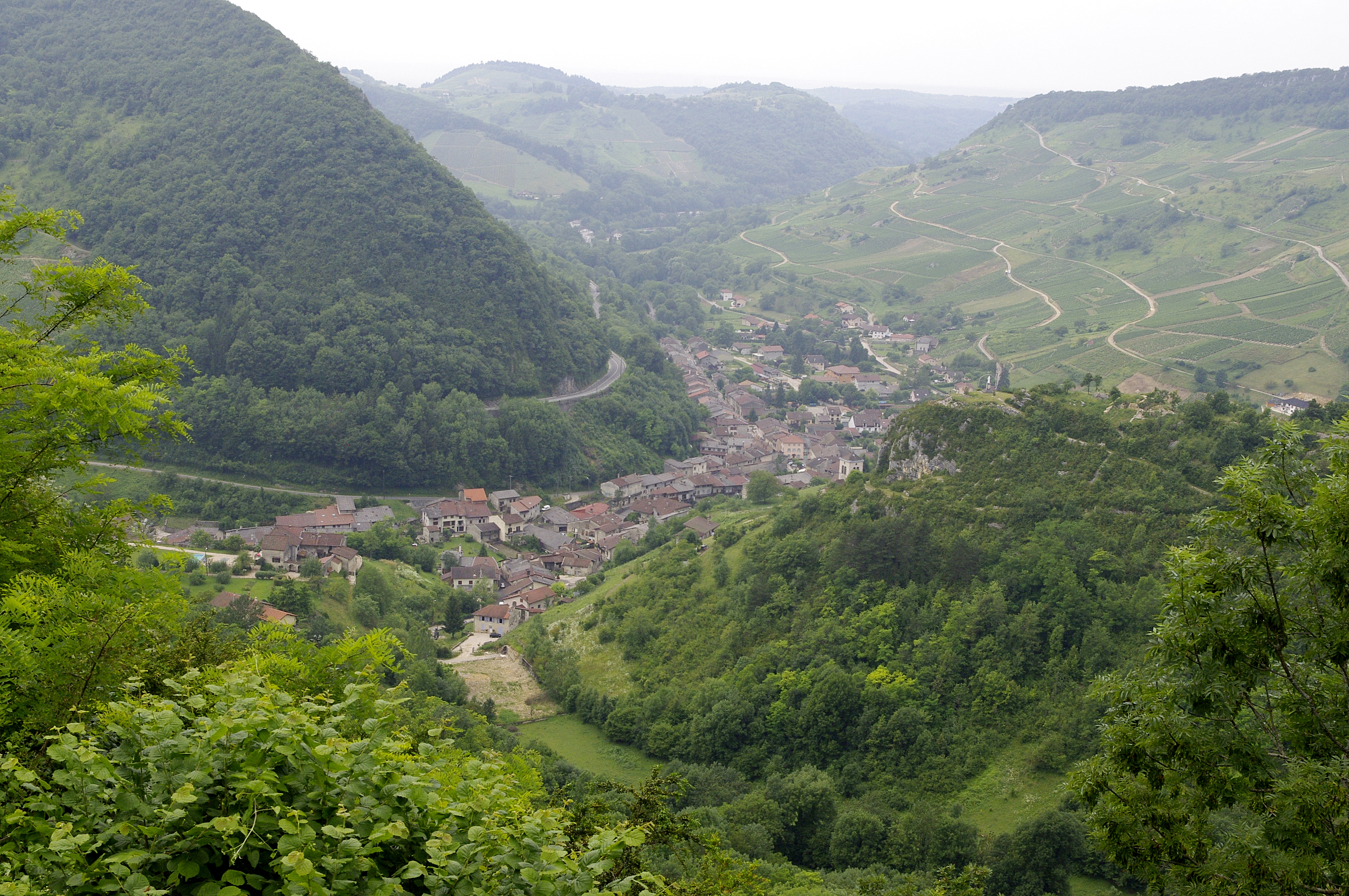

- Coat of arms
- Location of Cerdon
- Location within France Location within Auvergne-Rhône-Alpes
- Coordinates: 46°04′53″N 5°28′00″E
- Country: France
- Region: Auvergne-Rhône-Alpes
- Department: Ain
- Arrondissement: Nantua
- Canton: Pont-d'Ain
- Intercommunality: Rives de l'Ain - Pays du Cerdon

Government
  - Mayor (2024–2026): Eric Casamassa
- Area^{1}: 12.30 km^{2} (4.75 sq mi)
- Elevation: 300 m (980 ft)
- Highest elevation: 992 m (3,255 ft)
- Lowest elevation: 286 m (938 ft)
- Population (2023): 747
  - Density: 60.7/km^{2} (157/sq mi)
- Time zone: UTC+01:00 (CET)
  - Summer (DST): UTC+02:00 (CEST)
- INSEE/Postal code: 01068 /01450
- ^{1} French Land Register data, which excludes lakes, ponds, glaciers > 1 km^{2} (0.386 sq mi or 247 acres) and river estuaries.

Cerdon (French pronunciation: [sɛʁdɔ̃]) is a commune in the Ain department in eastern France.

It is known for its pink sparkling wine, and for its copper factory, the only one of its kind in France. The cuivrerie (copper factory) closed in 2010.

== Population ==
Historical population
Year	Pop.	±% p.a.
1968	724	—
1975	652	−1.49%
1982	647	−0.11%
1990	672	+0.48%
1999	672	+0.00%
2007	779	+1.86%
2012	734	−1.18%
2017	783	+1.30%
2023	747	−0.78%
Source: INSEE

== Sights ==
- The copper factory
- The caves (Grottes du Cerdon)
- Monument to the Maquis of Ain
- Fantasticable

== See also ==
- Communes of the Ain department
