= Poncin =

Commune in Auvergne-Rhône-Alpes, France

- Commune
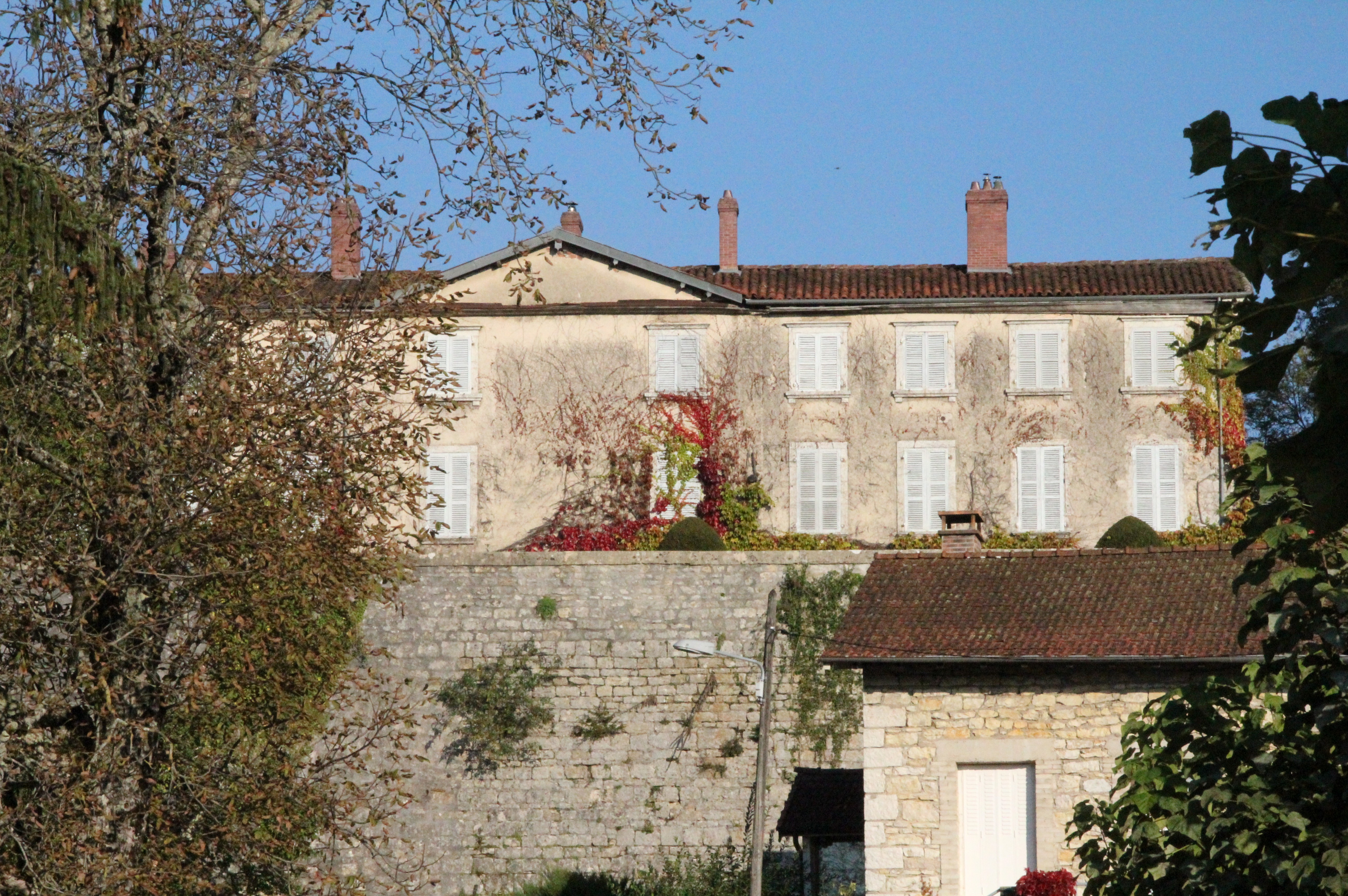
- Château de Poncin

- Coat of arms
- Location of Poncin
- Location within France Location within Auvergne-Rhône-Alpes
- Coordinates: 46°05′00″N 5°24′00″E
- Country: France
- Region: Auvergne-Rhône-Alpes
- Department: Ain
- Arrondissement: Nantua
- Canton: Pont-d'Ain
- Intercommunality: Rives de l'Ain - Pays du Cerdon

Government
  - Mayor (2026–32): Christophe Fournier
- Area^{1}: 19.77 km^{2} (7.63 sq mi)
- Elevation: 265 m (869 ft)
- Highest elevation: 540 m (1,770 ft)
- Lowest elevation: 240 m (790 ft)
- Population (2023): 1,803
  - Density: 91.20/km^{2} (236.2/sq mi)
- Time zone: UTC+01:00 (CET)
  - Summer (DST): UTC+02:00 (CEST)
- INSEE/Postal code: 01303 /01450
- ^{1} French Land Register data, which excludes lakes, ponds, glaciers > 1 km^{2} (0.386 sq mi or 247 acres) and river estuaries.

Poncin (French pronunciation: [pɔ̃sɛ̃]) is a commune in the Ain department in eastern France. It lies on the banks of the river Ain.

== History ==
Of strategic importance during medieval times, Poncin is surrounded by city walls that are still in perfect shape despite their age. The village was originally intended to receive the same patronage as Pérouges but the plan never reached fruition.

== Population ==
Historical population
Year	Pop.	±% p.a.
1968	1,210	—
1975	1,115	−1.16%
1982	1,144	+0.37%
1990	1,229	+0.90%
1999	1,360	+1.13%
2007	1,576	+1.86%
2012	1,687	+1.37%
2017	1,703	+0.19%
2023	1,803	+0.96%
Source: INSEE

== See also ==
- Communes of the Ain department
