= Pont-d'Ain =

Commune in Auvergne-Rhône-Alpes, France

Pont-d'Ain Pont d'En (Arpitan)
- Commune
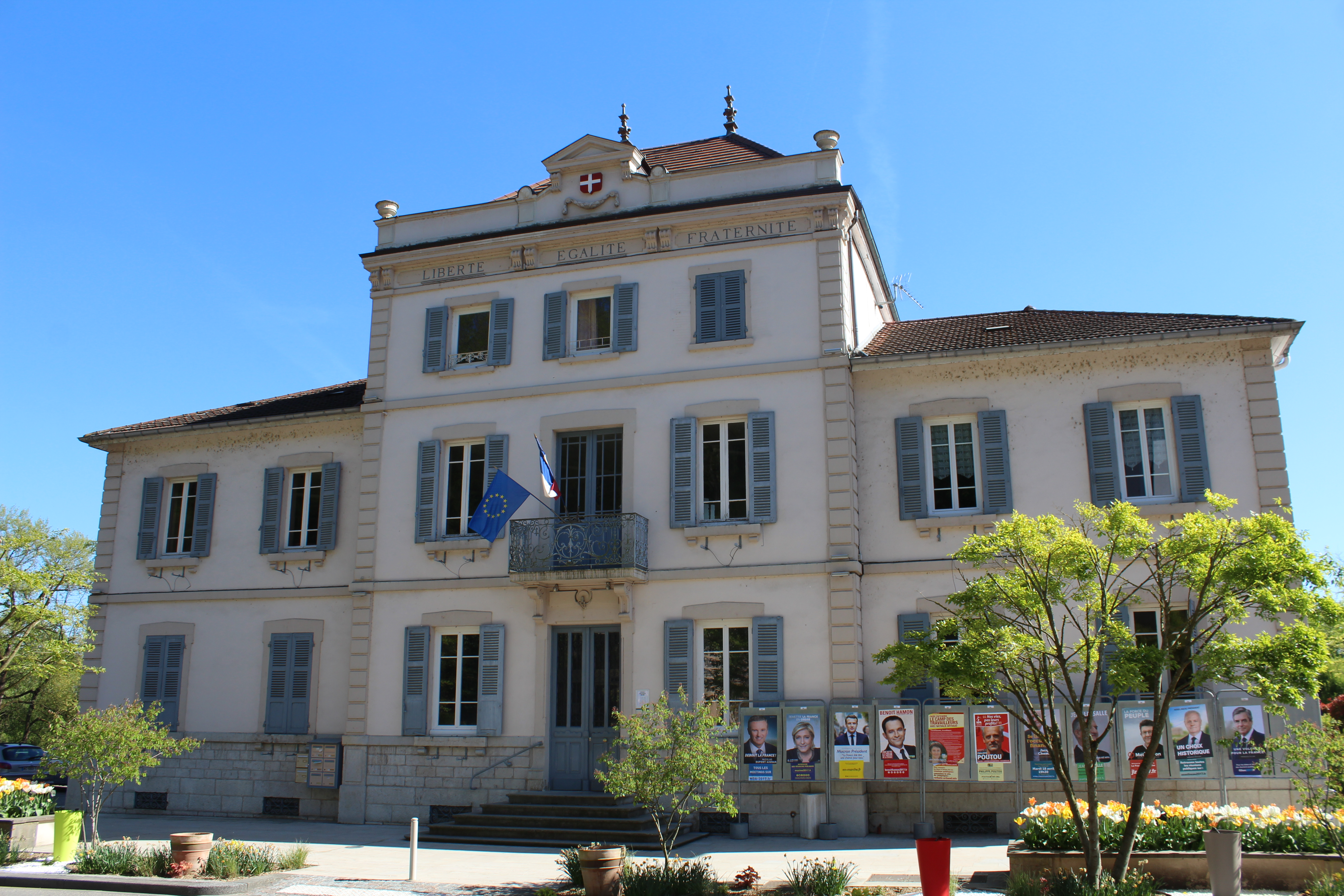
- Pont-d'Ain Town Hall

- Coat of arms
- Location of Pont-d'Ain
- Location within France Location within Auvergne-Rhône-Alpes
- Coordinates: 46°03′00″N 5°20′00″E
- Country: France
- Region: Auvergne-Rhône-Alpes
- Department: Ain
- Arrondissement: Nantua
- Canton: Pont-d'Ain
- Intercommunality: Rives de l'Ain - Pays du Cerdon

Government
  - Mayor (2023–2026): Vincent Bourdeauducq
- Area^{1}: 11.22 km^{2} (4.33 sq mi)
- Elevation: 246 m (807 ft)
- Highest elevation: 314 m (1,030 ft)
- Lowest elevation: 232 m (761 ft)
- Population (2023): 2,843
  - Density: 253.4/km^{2} (656.3/sq mi)
- Time zone: UTC+01:00 (CET)
  - Summer (DST): UTC+02:00 (CEST)
- INSEE/Postal code: 01304 /01160
- ^{1} French Land Register data, which excludes lakes, ponds, glaciers > 1 km^{2} (0.386 sq mi or 247 acres) and river estuaries.

Pont-d'Ain (French pronunciation: [pɔ̃ dɛ̃]; Arpitan: Pont d'En, also Lo Pont d'En; lit. "Bridge of Ain") is a commune in the Ain department in the Auvergne-Rhône-Alpes region in Eastern France.

It is best known for its Château de Pont-d'Ain (Castle of Pont-d'Ain) on the right bank of the Ain River, a monument historique since 2004. It was built in the 14th century, before it was refurbished and reorganised a number of times.

== Transport ==
Pont-d'Ain is served by Pont-d'Ain station on the Mâcon–Ambérieu railway, operated by the SNCF.

== Demographics ==
Historical population

Year	Pop.	±% p.a.
1793	1,069	—
1821	1,140	+0.23%
1846	1,303	+0.54%
1872	1,444	+0.40%
1901	1,722	+0.61%
1926	1,507	−0.53%
1946	1,048	−1.80%
1962	1,824	+3.52%
1968	1,972	+1.31%

Year	Pop.	±% p.a.
1975	2,266	+2.01%
1982	2,224	−0.27%
1990	2,258	+0.19%
1999	2,307	+0.24%
2007	2,459	+0.80%
2012	2,668	+1.64%
2017	2,964	+2.13%
2023	2,843	−0.69%

Source: EHESS and INSEE (1968–2023)

== See also ==
- Communes of the Ain department
- List of medieval bridges in France
