= Labalme =

Commune in Auvergne-Rhône-Alpes, France

- Commune
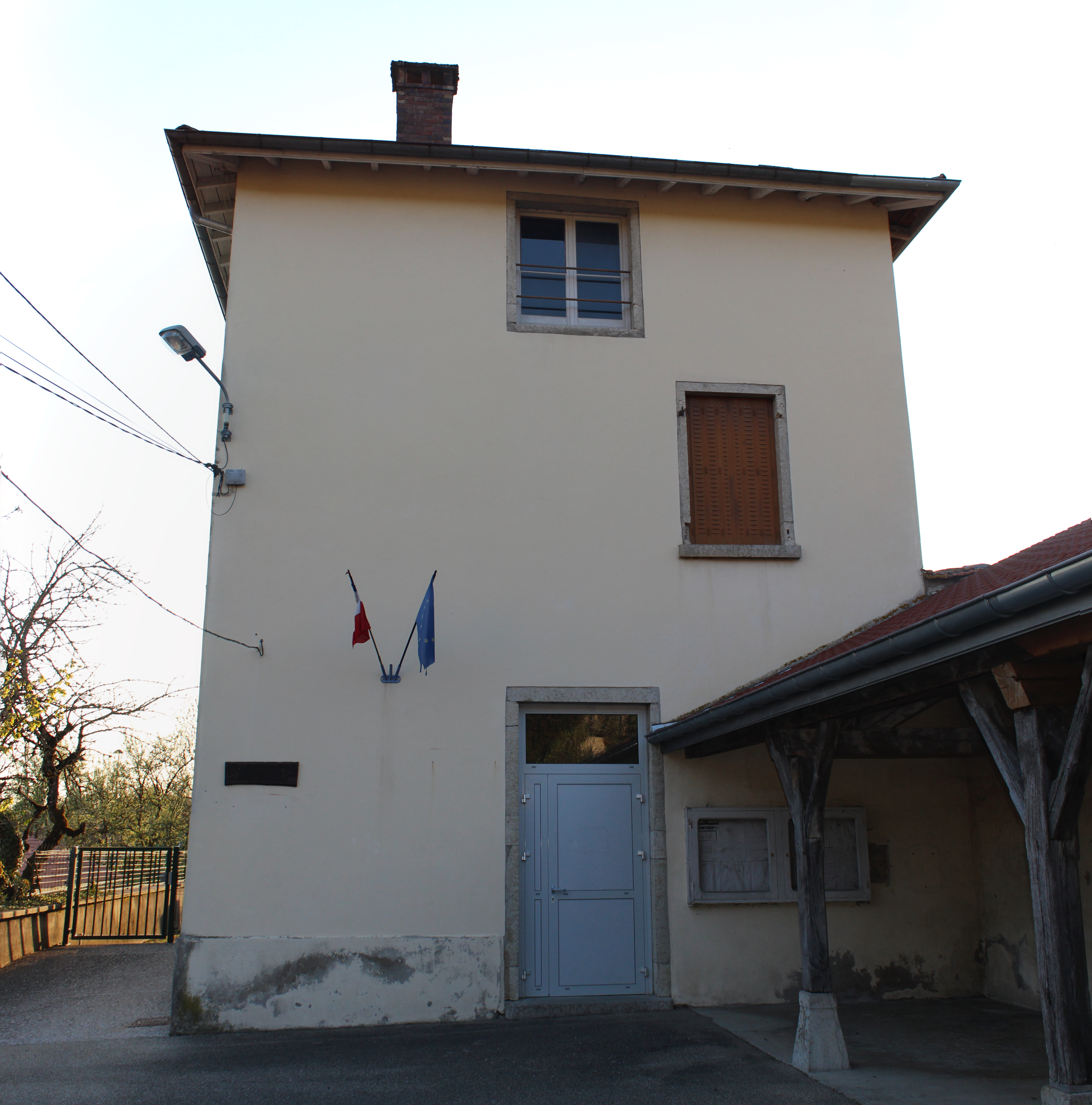
- Town hall
- Location of Labalme
- Location within France Location within Auvergne-Rhône-Alpes
- Coordinates: 46°05′38″N 5°29′01″E
- Country: France
- Region: Auvergne-Rhône-Alpes
- Department: Ain
- Arrondissement: Nantua
- Canton: Pont-d'Ain

Government
  - Mayor (2026–32): Thierry Coquille
- Area^{1}: 8.8 km^{2} (3.4 sq mi)
- Elevation: 600 m (2,000 ft)
- Highest elevation: 999 m (3,278 ft)
- Lowest elevation: 473 m (1,552 ft)
- Population (2023): 204
  - Density: 23/km^{2} (60/sq mi)
- Time zone: UTC+01:00 (CET)
  - Summer (DST): UTC+02:00 (CEST)
- INSEE/Postal code: 01200 /01450
- ^{1} French Land Register data, which excludes lakes, ponds, glaciers > 1 km^{2} (0.386 sq mi or 247 acres) and river estuaries.

Labalme (French pronunciation: [labalm]) is a commune in the Ain department in eastern France.

== Population ==
Historical population
Year	Pop.	±% p.a.
1968	140	—
1975	117	−2.53%
1982	104	−1.67%
1990	120	+1.80%
1999	135	+1.32%
2007	156	+1.82%
2012	202	+5.30%
2017	210	+0.78%
2023	204	−0.48%
Source: INSEE

== See also ==
- Communes of the Ain department
