= Samognat =

Commune in Auvergne-Rhône-Alpes, France

- Commune
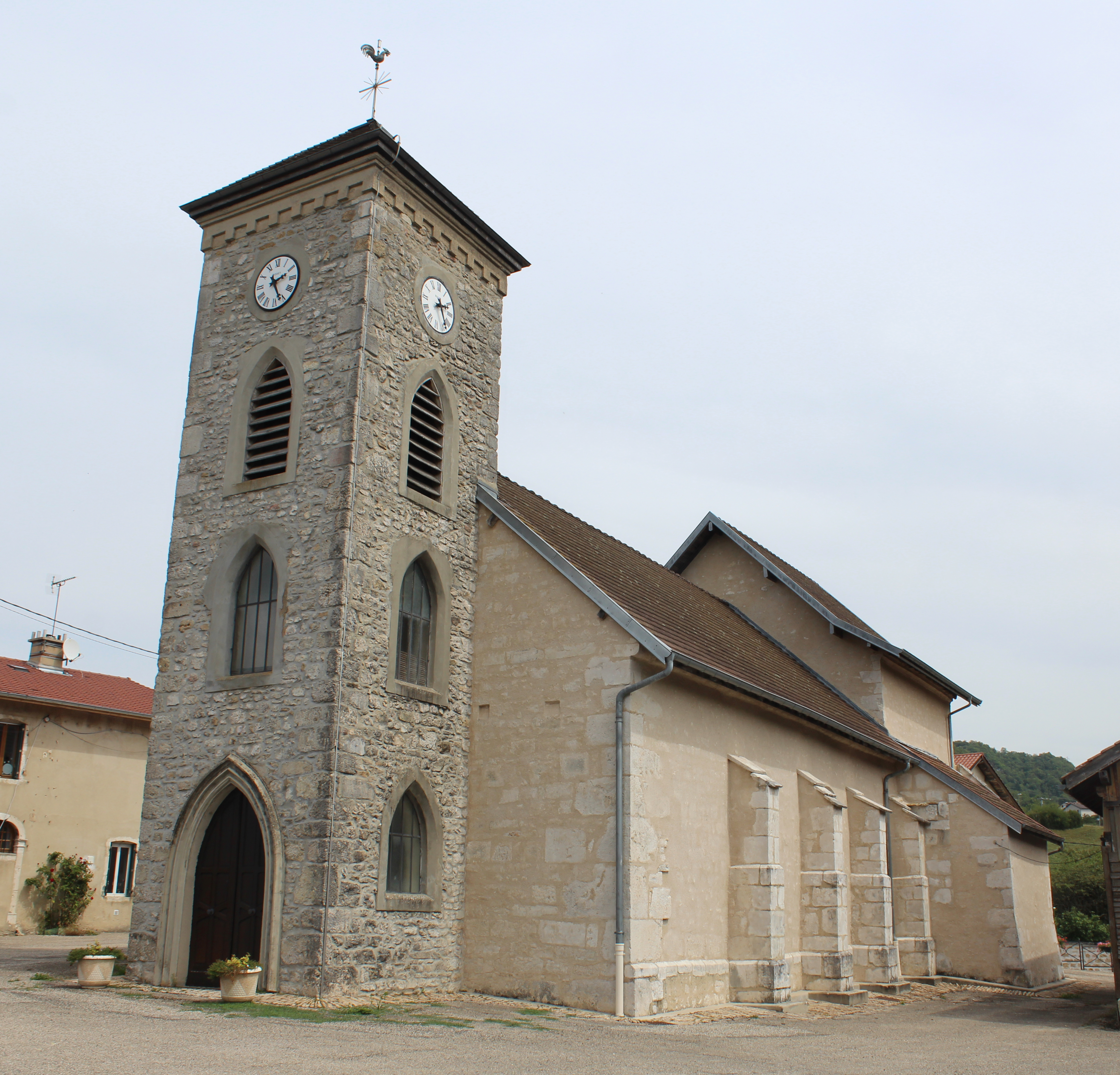
- Location of Samognat
- Location within France Location within Auvergne-Rhône-Alpes
- Coordinates: 46°15′31″N 5°34′37″E
- Country: France
- Region: Auvergne-Rhône-Alpes
- Department: Ain
- Arrondissement: Nantua
- Canton: Pont-d'Ain
- Intercommunality: Haut-Bugey Agglomération

Government
  - Mayor (2026–32): Xavier Reynier
- Area^{1}: 14.01 km^{2} (5.41 sq mi)
- Elevation: 437 m (1,434 ft)
- Highest elevation: 731 m (2,398 ft)
- Lowest elevation: 288 m (945 ft)
- Population (2023): 630
  - Density: 45/km^{2} (120/sq mi)
- Time zone: UTC+01:00 (CET)
  - Summer (DST): UTC+02:00 (CEST)
- INSEE/Postal code: 01392 /01580
- ^{1} French Land Register data, which excludes lakes, ponds, glaciers > 1 km^{2} (0.386 sq mi or 247 acres) and river estuaries.

Samognat (French pronunciation: [samɔɲa]) is a commune in the Ain department in eastern France.

== Population ==
Historical population
Year	Pop.	±% p.a.
1968	119	—
1975	156	+3.94%
1982	238	+6.22%
1990	285	+2.28%
1999	422	+4.46%
2007	656	+5.67%
2012	691	+1.05%
2017	653	−1.12%
2023	630	−0.60%
Source: INSEE

== See also ==
- Communes of the Ain department
