= Mérignat =

Commune in Auvergne-Rhône-Alpes, France

- Commune
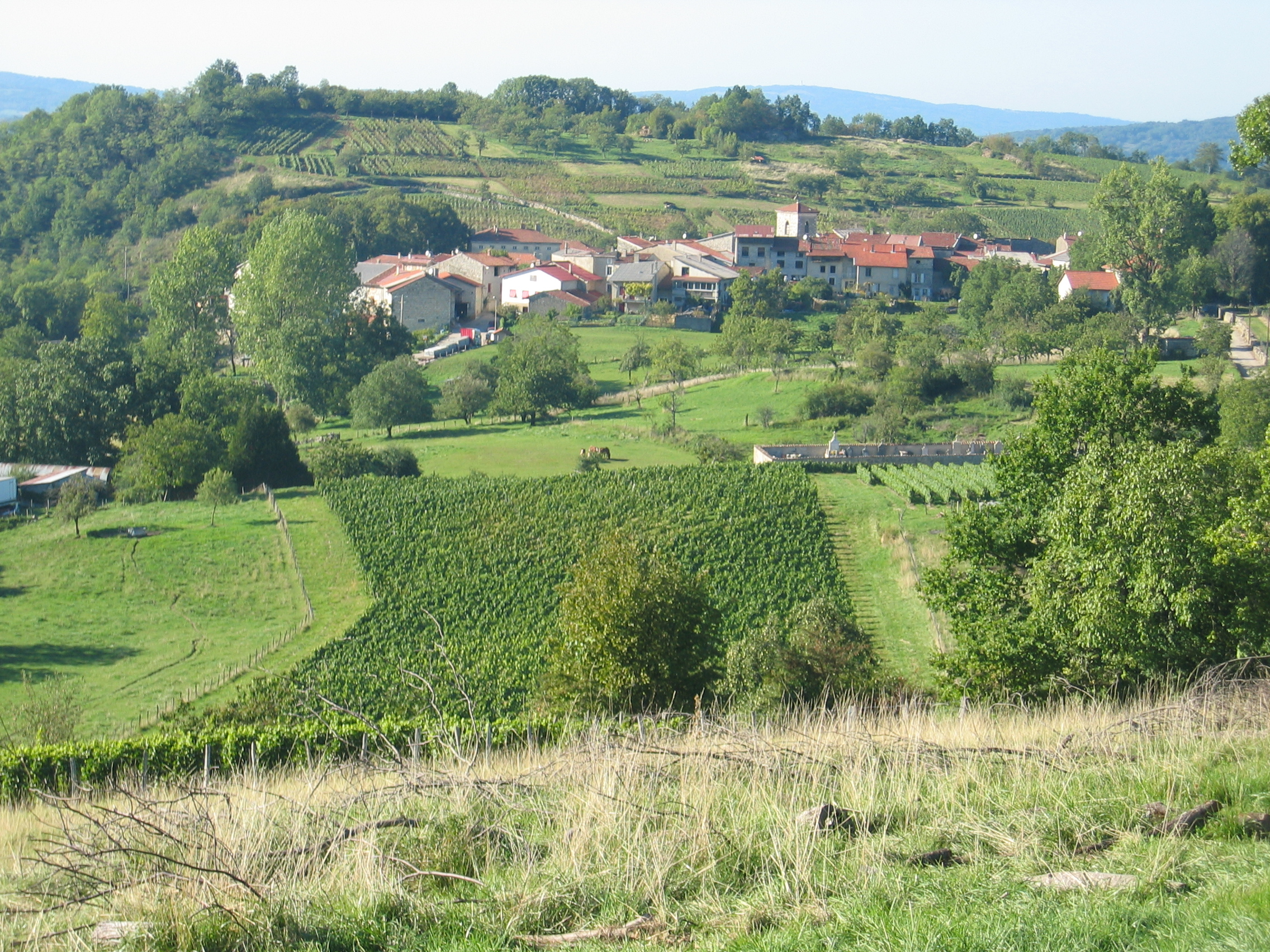
- Location of Mérignat
- Location within France Location within Auvergne-Rhône-Alpes
- Coordinates: 46°04′13″N 5°26′15″E
- Country: France
- Region: Auvergne-Rhône-Alpes
- Department: Ain
- Arrondissement: Nantua
- Canton: Pont-d'Ain
- Intercommunality: Rives de l'Ain - Pays du Cerdon

Government
  - Mayor (2026–32): Louis Terral
- Area^{1}: 3.17 km^{2} (1.22 sq mi)
- Elevation: 385 m (1,263 ft)
- Highest elevation: 587 m (1,926 ft)
- Lowest elevation: 300 m (980 ft)
- Population (2023): 129
  - Density: 40.7/km^{2} (105/sq mi)
- Time zone: UTC+01:00 (CET)
  - Summer (DST): UTC+02:00 (CEST)
- INSEE/Postal code: 01242 /01450
- ^{1} French Land Register data, which excludes lakes, ponds, glaciers > 1 km^{2} (0.386 sq mi or 247 acres) and river estuaries.

Mérignat (French pronunciation: [meʁiɲa]) is a commune in the Ain department in eastern France.

== Population ==
Historical population
Year	Pop.	±% p.a.
1968	90	—
1975	86	−0.65%
1982	80	−1.03%
1990	85	+0.76%
1999	114	+3.32%
2007	133	+1.95%
2012	130	−0.46%
2017	130	+0.00%
2023	129	−0.13%
Source: INSEE

== See also ==
- Communes of the Ain department
