= Ceignes =

Commune in Auvergne-Rhône-Alpes, France

- Commune
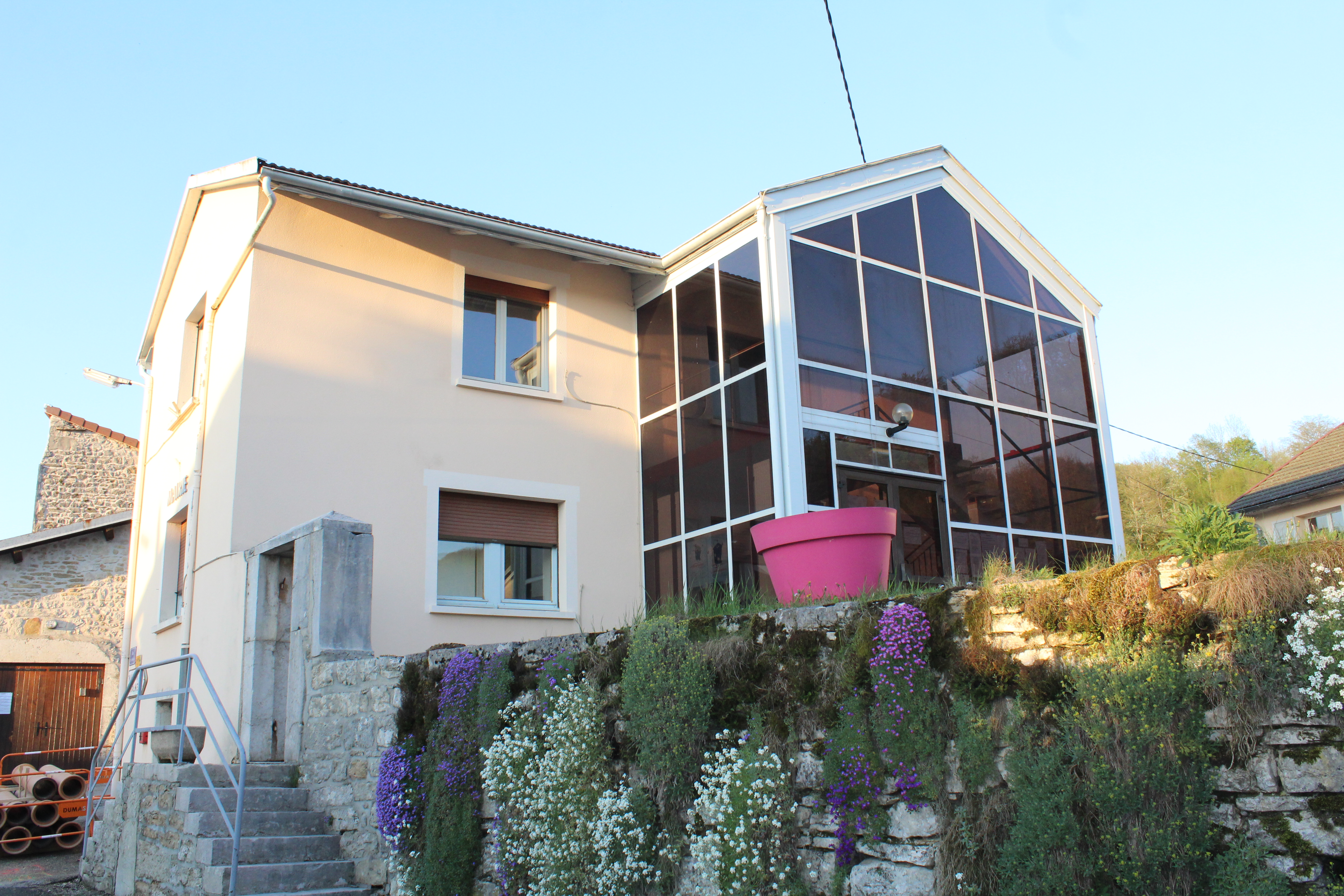
- Town hall
- Location of Ceignes
- Location within France Location within Auvergne-Rhône-Alpes
- Coordinates: 46°07′15″N 5°30′00″E
- Country: France
- Region: Auvergne-Rhône-Alpes
- Department: Ain
- Arrondissement: Nantua
- Canton: Pont-d'Ain
- Intercommunality: Haut-Bugey Agglomération

Government
  - Mayor (2026–32): Alain Auboeuf
- Area^{1}: 10.01 km^{2} (3.86 sq mi)
- Elevation: 630 m (2,070 ft)
- Highest elevation: 862 m (2,828 ft)
- Lowest elevation: 580 m (1,900 ft)
- Population (2023): 257
  - Density: 25.7/km^{2} (66.5/sq mi)
- Time zone: UTC+01:00 (CET)
  - Summer (DST): UTC+02:00 (CEST)
- INSEE/Postal code: 01067 /01430
- ^{1} French Land Register data, which excludes lakes, ponds, glaciers > 1 km^{2} (0.386 sq mi or 247 acres) and river estuaries.

Ceignes (French pronunciation: [sɛɲ]) is a commune in the Ain department in eastern France.

== Population ==
Historical population
Year	Pop.	±% p.a.
1968	124	—
1975	114	−1.19%
1982	136	+2.55%
1990	160	+2.05%
1999	230	+4.11%
2007	277	+2.35%
2012	261	−1.18%
2017	254	−0.54%
2023	257	+0.20%
Source: INSEE

== See also ==
- Communes of the Ain department
