= Nurieux-Volognat =

Commune in Auvergne-Rhône-Alpes, France

- Commune
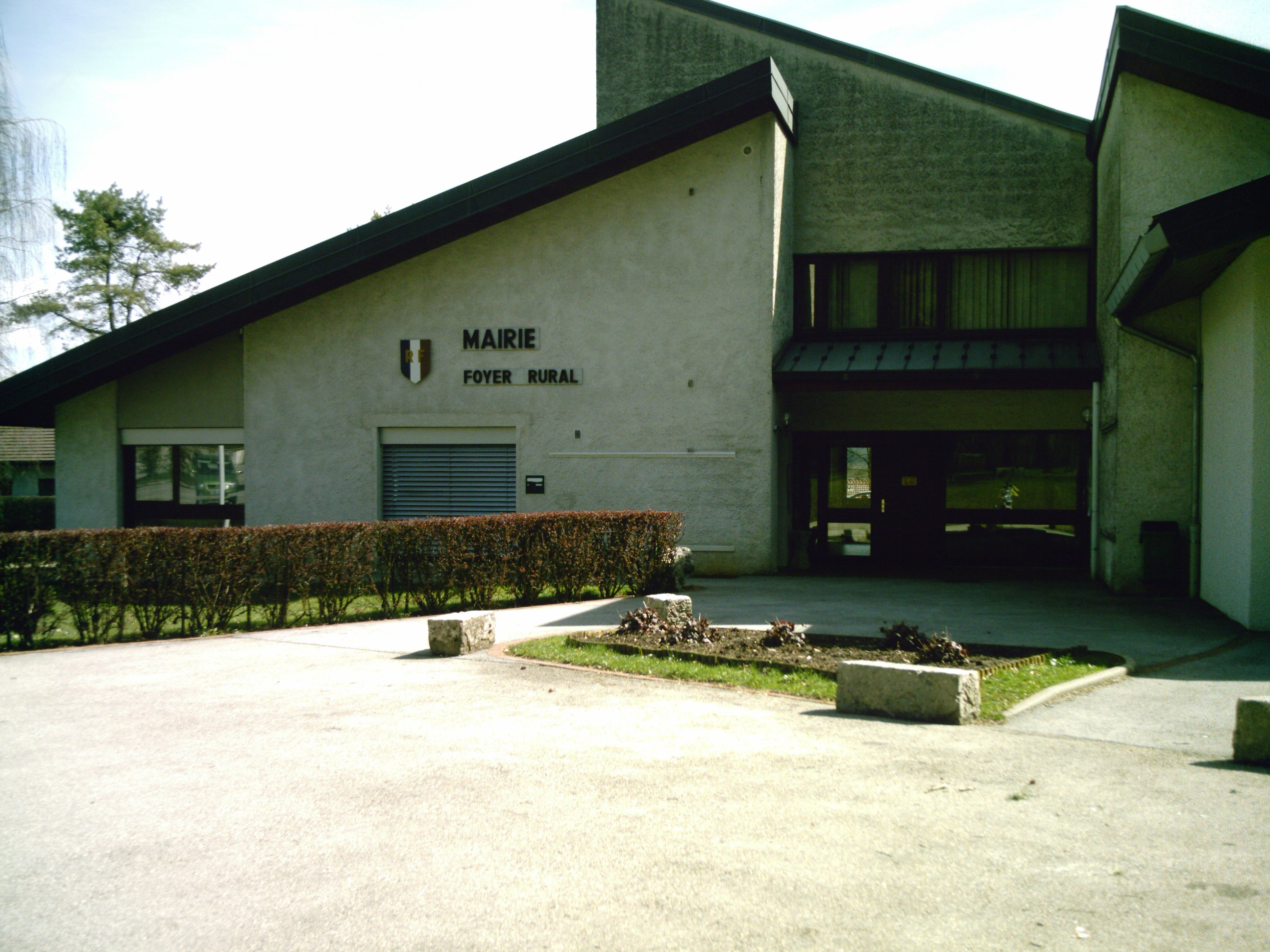
- Town hall

- Coat of arms
- Location of Nurieux-Volognat
- Location within France Location within Auvergne-Rhône-Alpes
- Coordinates: 46°11′11″N 5°31′37″E
- Country: France
- Region: Auvergne-Rhône-Alpes
- Department: Ain
- Arrondissement: Nantua
- Canton: Pont-d'Ain
- Intercommunality: Haut-Bugey Agglomération

Government
  - Mayor (2020–2026): Arlette Berger
- Area^{1}: 19.31 km^{2} (7.46 sq mi)
- Elevation: 500 m (1,600 ft)
- Highest elevation: 840 m (2,760 ft)
- Lowest elevation: 448 m (1,470 ft)
- Population (2023): 965
  - Density: 50.0/km^{2} (129/sq mi)
- Time zone: UTC+01:00 (CET)
  - Summer (DST): UTC+02:00 (CEST)
- INSEE/Postal code: 01267 /01460
- ^{1} French Land Register data, which excludes lakes, ponds, glaciers > 1 km^{2} (0.386 sq mi or 247 acres) and river estuaries.

Nurieux-Volognat (French pronunciation: [nyʁjø vɔlɔɲa]) is a commune in the Ain department in eastern France. It was established in 1973 by the merger of the former communes Mornay and Volognat.

== Population ==
Historical population
| Year | Pop. | ±% p.a. |
|---|---|---|
| 1968 | 500 | — |
| 1975 | 567 | +1.81% |
| 1982 | 656 | +2.10% |
| 1990 | 856 | +3.38% |
| 1999 | 952 | +1.19% |
| 2007 | 1,094 | +1.75% |
| 2012 | 1,037 | −1.06% |
| 2017 | 1,028 | −0.17% |
| 2023 | 965 | −1.05% |
Source: INSEE

== See also ==
- Communes of the Ain department
