= Leyssard =

Commune in Auvergne-Rhône-Alpes, France

- Commune
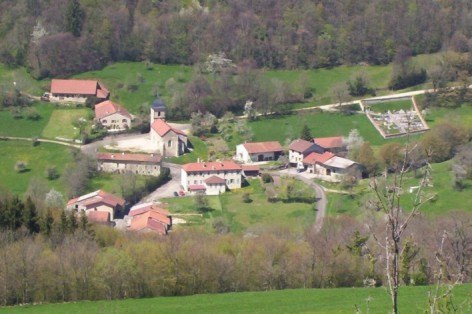

- Coat of arms
- Location of Leyssard
- Location within France Location within Auvergne-Rhône-Alpes
- Coordinates: 46°09′24″N 5°28′36″E
- Country: France
- Region: Auvergne-Rhône-Alpes
- Department: Ain
- Arrondissement: Nantua
- Canton: Pont-d'Ain
- Intercommunality: Haut-Bugey Agglomération

Government
  - Mayor (2026–32): Michel Mourlevat
- Area^{1}: 9.61 km^{2} (3.71 sq mi)
- Elevation: 570 m (1,870 ft)
- Highest elevation: 825 m (2,707 ft)
- Lowest elevation: 280 m (920 ft)
- Population (2023): 164
  - Density: 17.1/km^{2} (44.2/sq mi)
- Time zone: UTC+01:00 (CET)
  - Summer (DST): UTC+02:00 (CEST)
- INSEE/Postal code: 01214 /01450
- ^{1} French Land Register data, which excludes lakes, ponds, glaciers > 1 km^{2} (0.386 sq mi or 247 acres) and river estuaries.

Leyssard (French pronunciation: [lɛsaʁ]) is a commune in the Ain department in eastern France.

== Population ==
Historical population
Year	Pop.	±% p.a.
1968	120	—
1975	82	−5.29%
1982	95	+2.12%
1990	113	+2.19%
1999	143	+2.65%
2007	164	+1.73%
2012	147	−2.16%
2017	152	+0.67%
2023	164	+1.27%
Source: INSEE

== See also ==
- Communes of the Ain department
