= Challes-la-Montagne =

Commune in Auvergne-Rhône-Alpes, France

- Commune
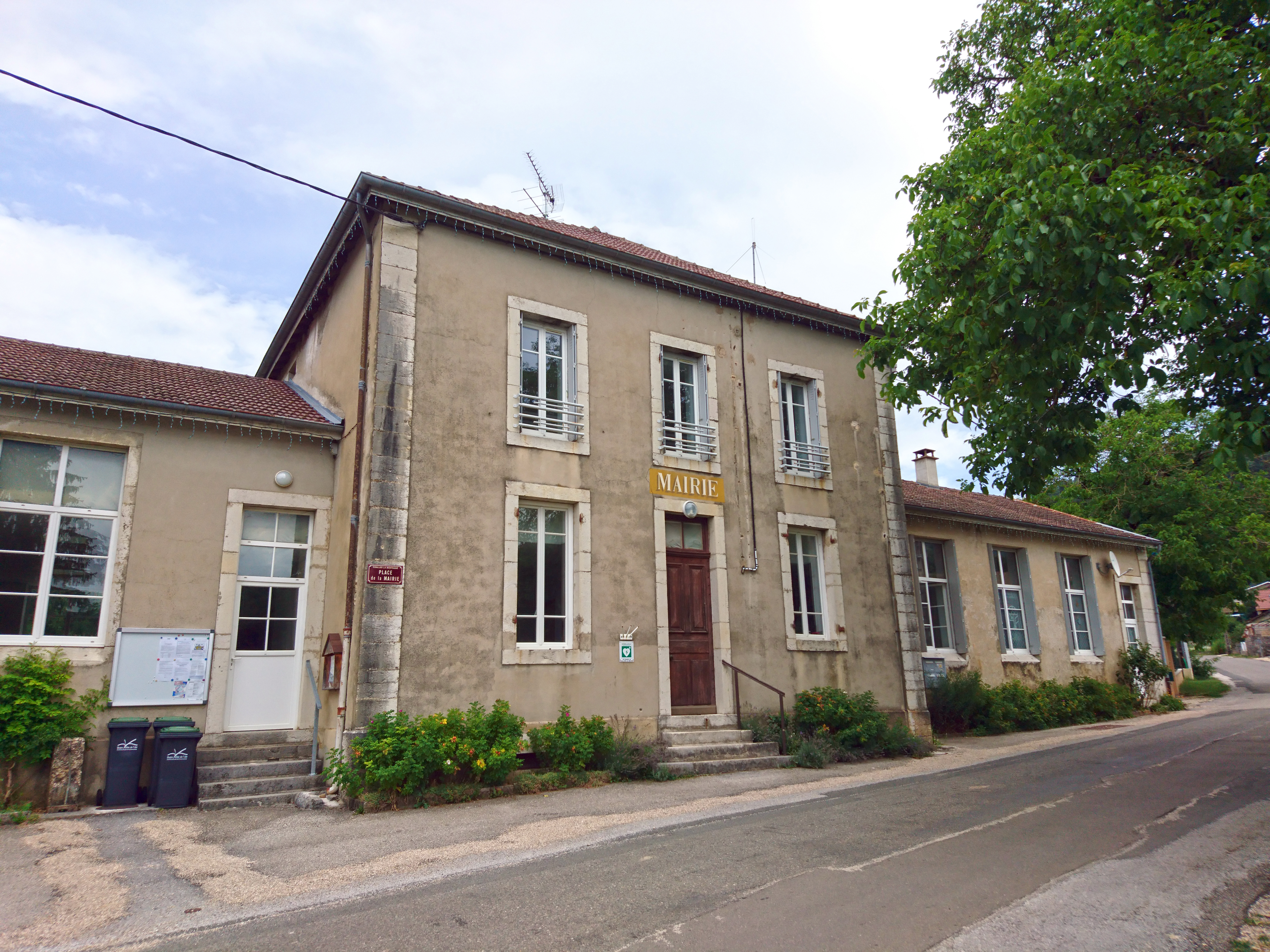
- Town hall

- Coat of arms
- Location of Challes-la-Montagne
- Location within France Location within Auvergne-Rhône-Alpes
- Coordinates: 46°07′33″N 5°27′54″E
- Country: France
- Region: Auvergne-Rhône-Alpes
- Department: Ain
- Arrondissement: Nantua
- Canton: Pont-d'Ain
- Intercommunality: Rives de l'Ain - Pays du Cerdon

Government
  - Mayor (2026–32): Yves Perret
- Area^{1}: 7.65 km^{2} (2.95 sq mi)
- Elevation: 480 m (1,570 ft)
- Highest elevation: 700 m (2,300 ft)
- Lowest elevation: 440 m (1,440 ft)
- Population (2023): 184
  - Density: 24.1/km^{2} (62.3/sq mi)
- Time zone: UTC+01:00 (CET)
  - Summer (DST): UTC+02:00 (CEST)
- INSEE/Postal code: 01077 /01450
- ^{1} French Land Register data, which excludes lakes, ponds, glaciers > 1 km^{2} (0.386 sq mi or 247 acres) and river estuaries.

Challes-la-Montagne (French pronunciation: [ʃal la mɔ̃taɲ]) is a commune in the Ain department in eastern France.

The commune was formerly called Challes and was officially renamed on 7 July 2006.

== Population ==
Historical population
| Year | Pop. | ±% p.a. |
|---|---|---|
| 1968 | 169 | — |
| 1975 | 135 | −3.16% |
| 1982 | 169 | +3.26% |
| 1990 | 193 | +1.67% |
| 1999 | 200 | +0.40% |
| 2007 | 187 | −0.84% |
| 2012 | 179 | −0.87% |
| 2017 | 194 | +1.62% |
| 2023 | 184 | −0.88% |
Source: INSEE

== See also ==
- Communes of the Ain department
