= Sonthonnax-la-Montagne =

Commune in Auvergne-Rhône-Alpes, France

- Commune
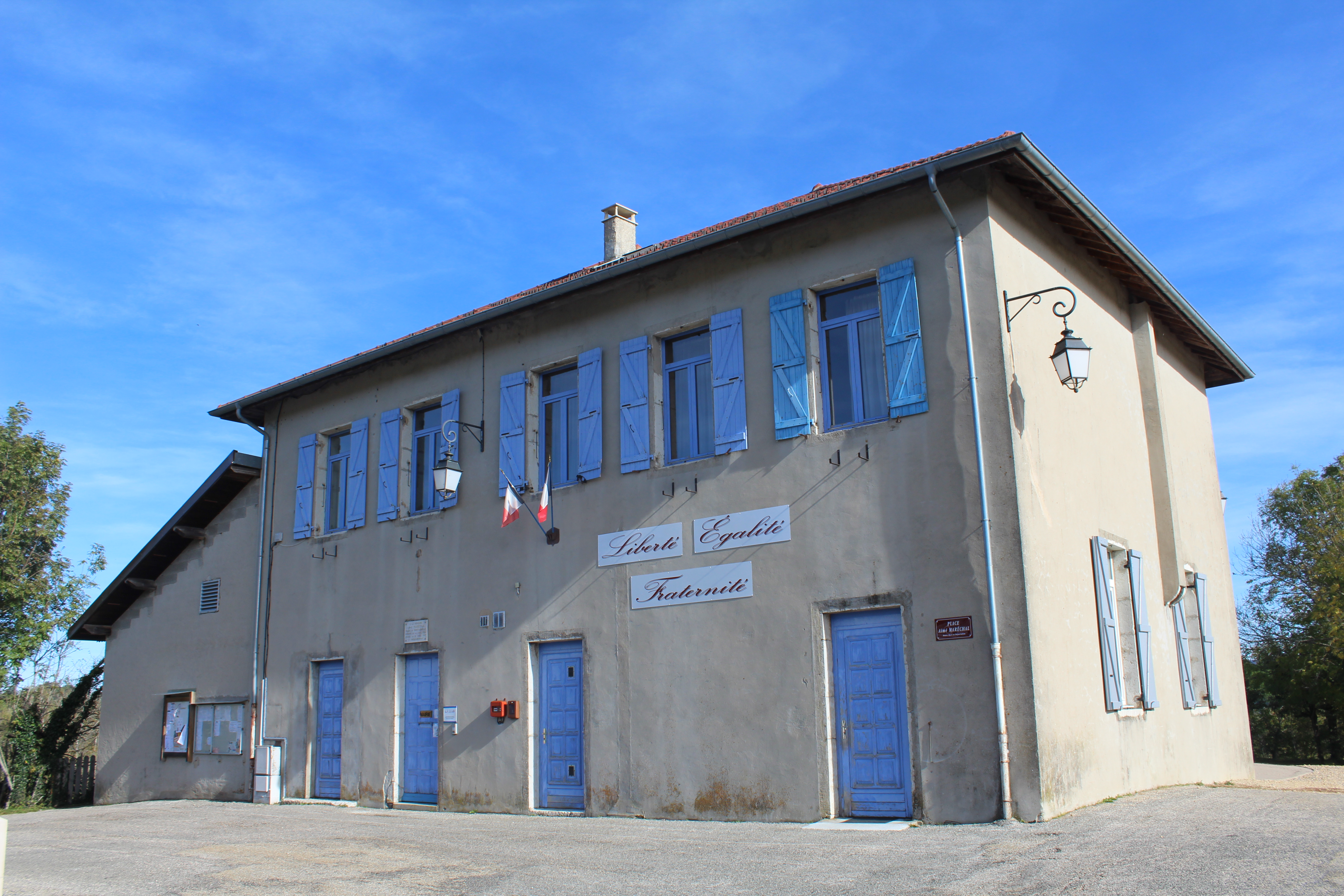
- Town hall
- Location of Sonthonnax-la-Montagne
- Location within France Location within Auvergne-Rhône-Alpes
- Coordinates: 46°14′02″N 5°31′29″E
- Country: France
- Region: Auvergne-Rhône-Alpes
- Department: Ain
- Arrondissement: Nantua
- Canton: Pont-d'Ain
- Intercommunality: Haut-Bugey Agglomération

Government
  - Mayor (2026–32): Fabrice Monaci
- Area^{1}: 14.14 km^{2} (5.46 sq mi)
- Elevation: 630 m (2,070 ft)
- Highest elevation: 783 m (2,569 ft)
- Lowest elevation: 420 m (1,380 ft)
- Population (2023): 293
  - Density: 20.7/km^{2} (53.7/sq mi)
- Time zone: UTC+01:00 (CET)
  - Summer (DST): UTC+02:00 (CEST)
- INSEE/Postal code: 01410 /01580
- ^{1} French Land Register data, which excludes lakes, ponds, glaciers > 1 km^{2} (0.386 sq mi or 247 acres) and river estuaries.

Sonthonnax-la-Montagne (French pronunciation: [sɔ̃tɔna la mɔ̃taɲ]) is a commune in the Ain department in eastern France.

== Population ==
Historical population
Year	Pop.	±% p.a.
1968	166	—
1975	153	−1.16%
1982	194	+3.45%
1990	242	+2.80%
1999	302	+2.49%
2007	317	+0.61%
2012	317	+0.00%
2017	312	−0.32%
2023	293	−1.04%
Source: INSEE

== See also ==
- Communes of the Ain department
