= Saint-Alban, Ain =

Commune in Auvergne-Rhône-Alpes, France

Saint-Alban
- Commune
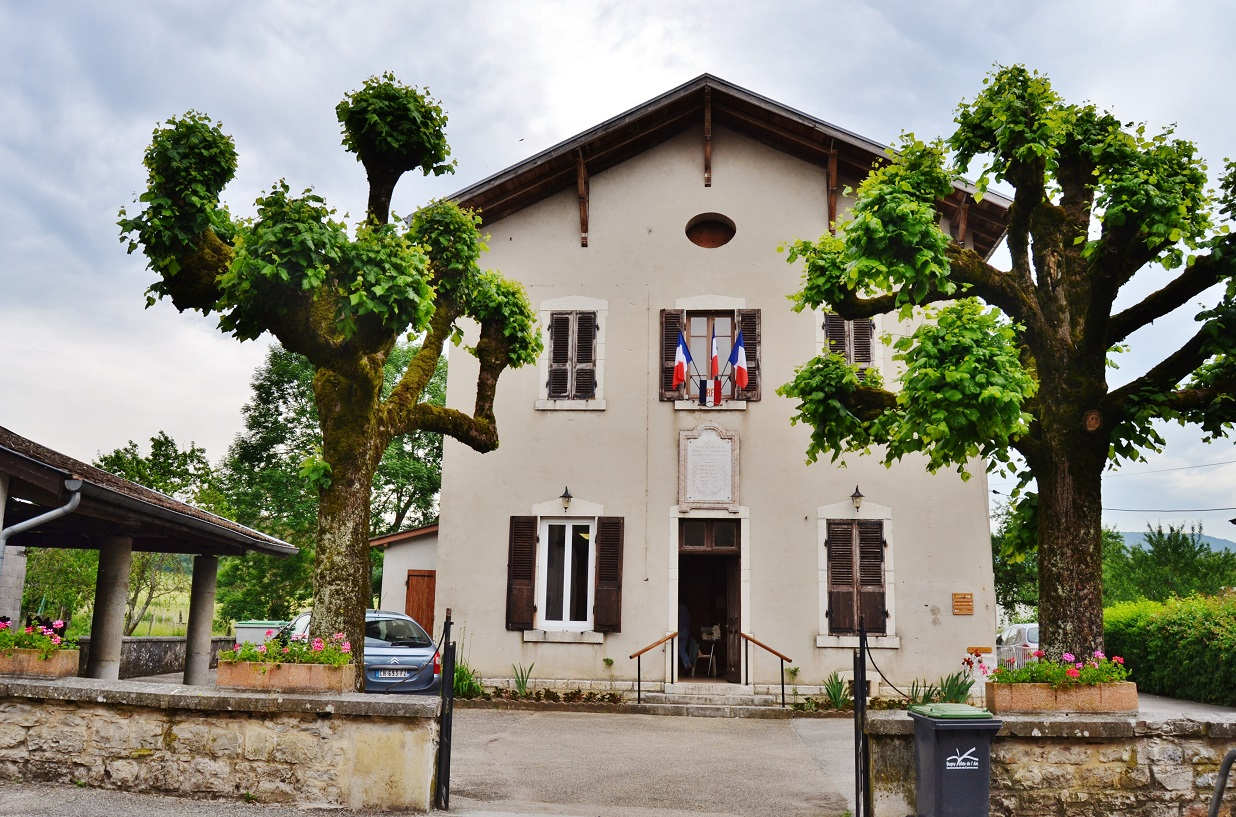
- Town hall
- Location of Saint-Alban
- Location within France Location within Auvergne-Rhône-Alpes
- Coordinates: 46°05′46″N 5°27′14″E
- Country: France
- Region: Auvergne-Rhône-Alpes
- Department: Ain
- Arrondissement: Nantua
- Canton: Pont-d'Ain
- Intercommunality: Rives de l'Ain-Pays du Cerdon

Government
  - Mayor (2026–32): Béatrice de Vecchi
- Area^{1}: 8.08 km^{2} (3.12 sq mi)
- Elevation: 520 m (1,710 ft)
- Highest elevation: 634 m (2,080 ft)
- Lowest elevation: 376 m (1,234 ft)
- Population (2023): 195
  - Density: 24.1/km^{2} (62.5/sq mi)
- Time zone: UTC+01:00 (CET)
  - Summer (DST): UTC+02:00 (CEST)
- INSEE/Postal code: 01331 /01450
- ^{1} French Land Register data, which excludes lakes, ponds, glaciers > 1 km^{2} (0.386 sq mi or 247 acres) and river estuaries.

Saint-Alban (French pronunciation: [sɛ̃t‿albɑ̃]) is a commune in the Ain department in eastern France.

== Population ==
Historical population
Year	Pop.	±% p.a.
1968	138	—
1975	114	−2.69%
1982	119	+0.62%
1990	122	+0.31%
1999	133	+0.96%
2007	179	+3.78%
2012	164	−1.74%
2017	178	+1.65%
2023	195	+1.53%
Source: INSEE

== See also ==
- Communes of the Ain department
