= Izernore =

Commune in Auvergne-Rhône-Alpes, France

- Commune
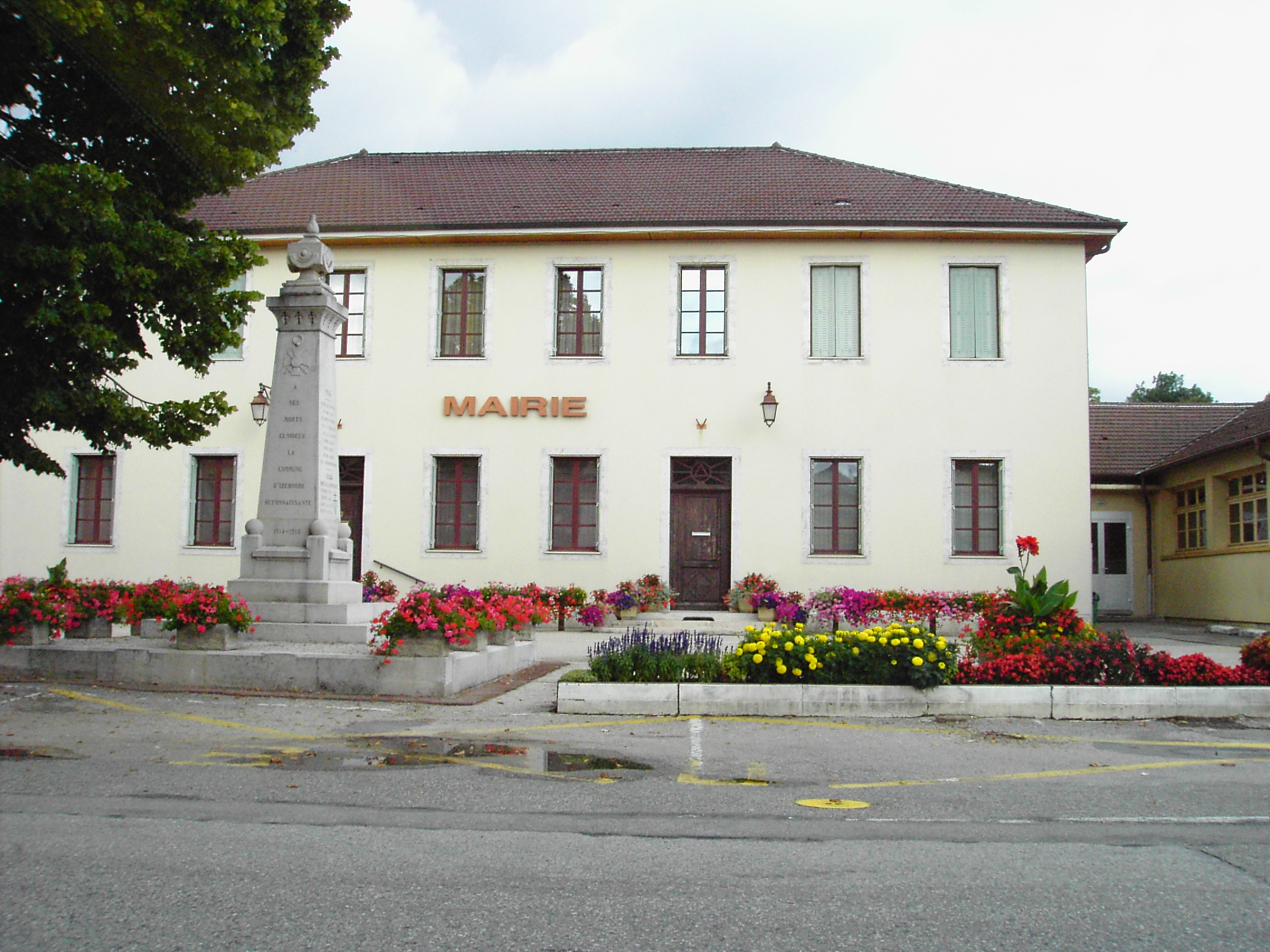
- Town hall

- Coat of arms
- Location of Izernore
- Location within France Location within Auvergne-Rhône-Alpes
- Coordinates: 46°13′00″N 5°33′00″E
- Country: France
- Region: Auvergne-Rhône-Alpes
- Department: Ain
- Arrondissement: Nantua
- Canton: Pont-d'Ain
- Intercommunality: Haut-Bugey Agglomération

Government
  - Mayor (2026–32): Michel Moine
- Area^{1}: 20.86 km^{2} (8.05 sq mi)
- Elevation: 452 m (1,483 ft)
- Highest elevation: 650 m (2,130 ft)
- Lowest elevation: 450 m (1,480 ft)
- Population (2023): 2,299
  - Density: 110.2/km^{2} (285.4/sq mi)
- Time zone: UTC+01:00 (CET)
  - Summer (DST): UTC+02:00 (CEST)
- INSEE/Postal code: 01192 /01580
- ^{1} French Land Register data, which excludes lakes, ponds, glaciers > 1 km^{2} (0.386 sq mi or 247 acres) and river estuaries.

Izernore (French pronunciation: [izɛʁnɔʁ]) is a commune in the Ain department in eastern France. An ancient Roman bronze hoard consisting of a patera and an oval dish was found in Izernore in 1845 and is now in the British Museum's collection.

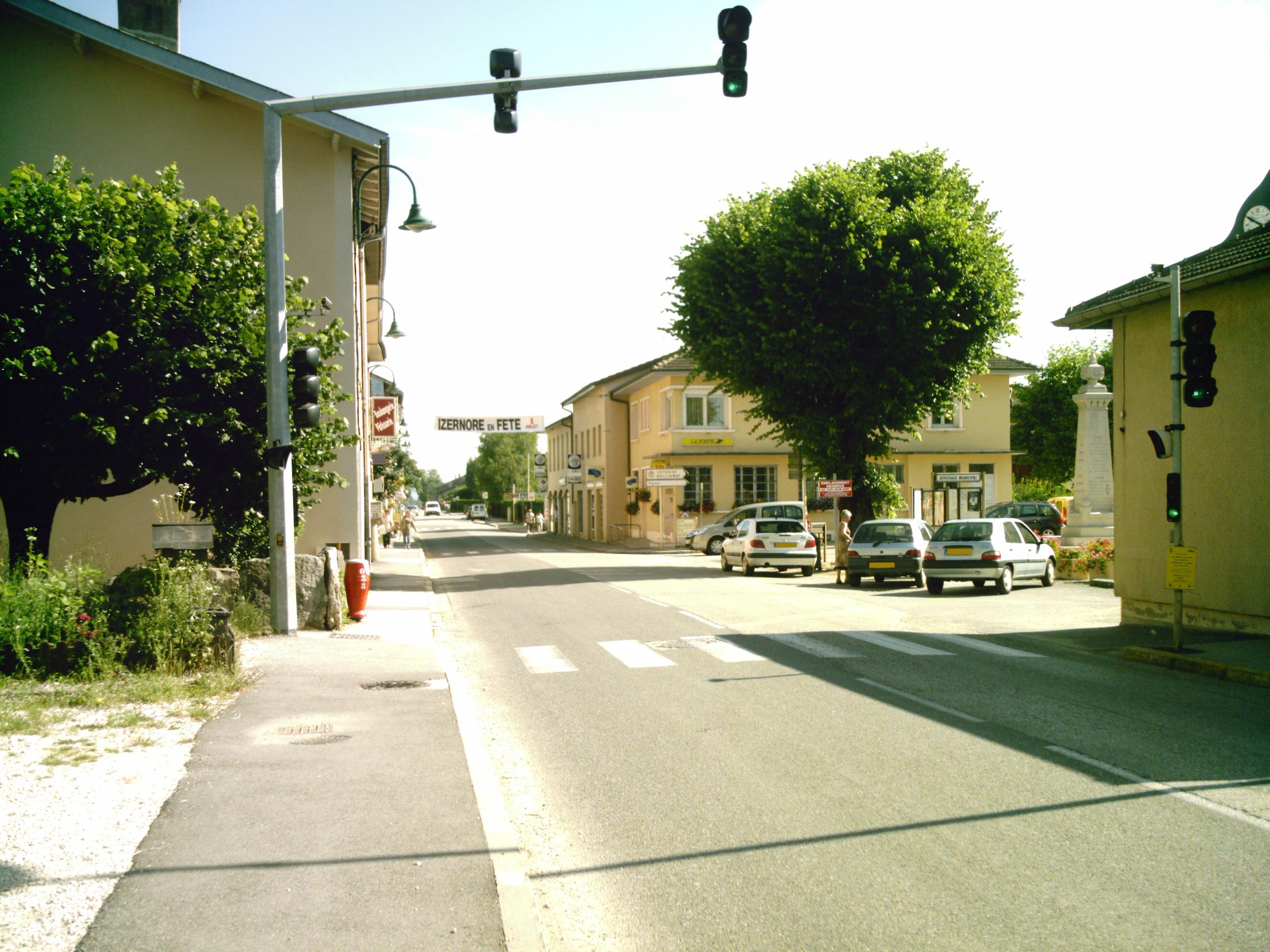
Izernore

== Population ==
Historical population

| Year | Pop. | ±% p.a. |
|---|---|---|
| 1793 | 941 | — |
| 1800 | 978 | +0.55% |
| 1806 | 1,016 | +0.64% |
| 1821 | 1,057 | +0.26% |
| 1831 | 1,005 | −0.50% |
| 1836 | 985 | −0.40% |
| 1841 | 1,011 | +0.52% |
| 1846 | 1,103 | +1.76% |
| 1851 | 1,103 | +0.00% |
| 1856 | 1,084 | −0.35% |
| 1861 | 1,044 | −0.75% |
| 1866 | 1,011 | −0.64% |
| 1872 | 1,021 | +0.16% |
| 1876 | 1,064 | +1.04% |
| 1881 | 1,079 | +0.28% |
| 1886 | 1,129 | +0.91% |
| 1891 | 1,016 | −2.09% |
| 1896 | 932 | −1.71% |
| 1901 | 879 | −1.16% |

| Year | Pop. | ±% p.a. |
|---|---|---|
| 1906 | 757 | −2.94% |
| 1911 | 660 | −2.71% |
| 1921 | 633 | −0.42% |
| 1926 | 601 | −1.03% |
| 1931 | 563 | −1.30% |
| 1936 | 593 | +1.04% |
| 1946 | 553 | −0.70% |
| 1954 | 557 | +0.09% |
| 1962 | 548 | −0.20% |
| 1968 | 520 | −0.87% |
| 1975 | 682 | +3.95% |
| 1982 | 975 | +5.24% |
| 1990 | 1,170 | +2.31% |
| 1999 | 1,656 | +3.94% |
| 2007 | 2,230 | +3.79% |
| 2012 | 2,309 | +0.70% |
| 2017 | 2,247 | −0.54% |
| 2023 | 2,299 | +0.38% |

Source: EHESS and INSEE (1968-2023)

== Personalities ==
It was the birthplace of St. Eugendus (born c. 449).

== See also ==
- Communes of the Ain department
