= Géovreisset =

Commune in Auvergne-Rhône-Alpes, France

- Commune
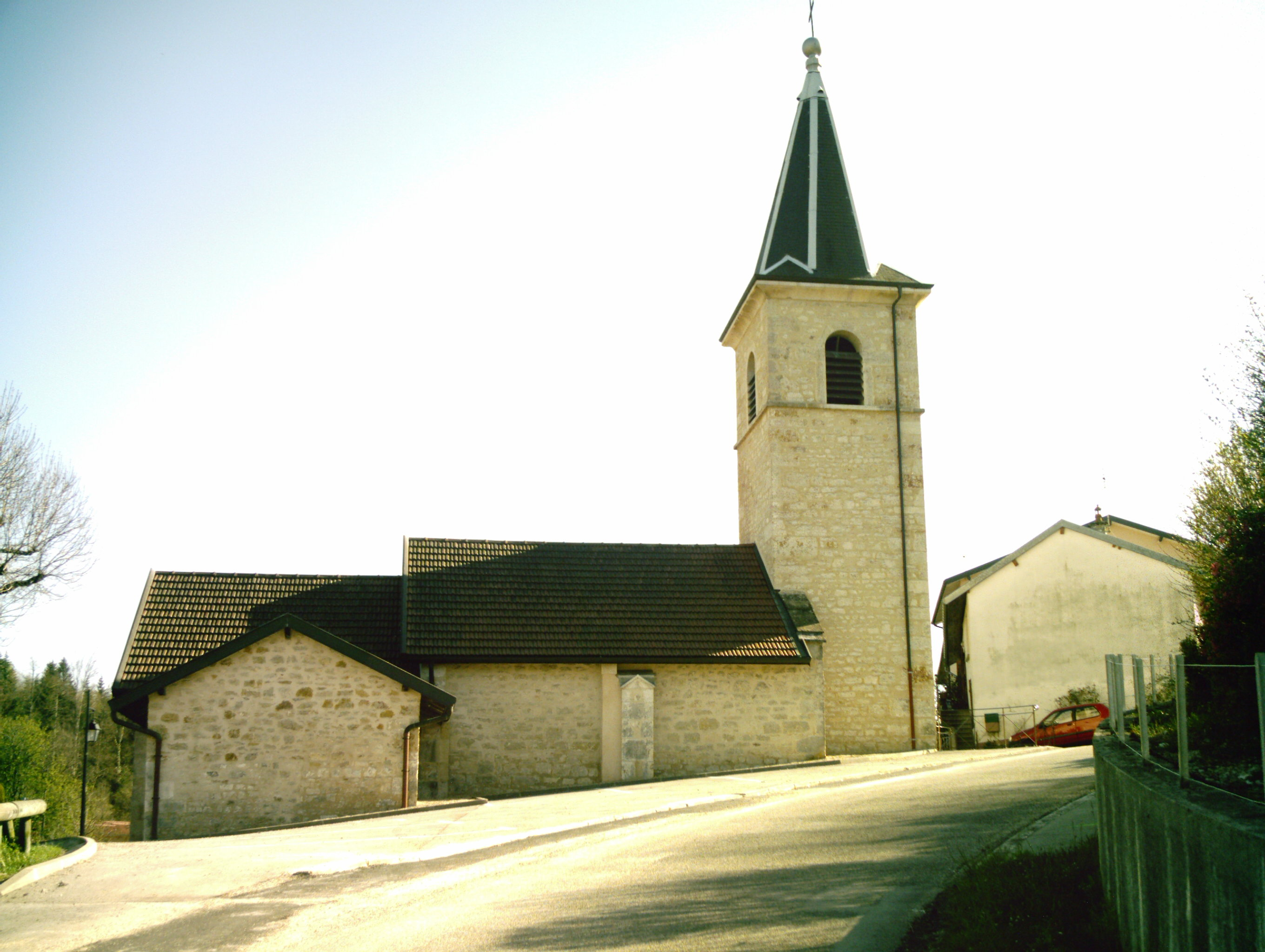
- Location of Géovreisset
- Location within France Location within Auvergne-Rhône-Alpes
- Coordinates: 46°15′25″N 5°37′05″E
- Country: France
- Region: Auvergne-Rhône-Alpes
- Department: Ain
- Arrondissement: Nantua
- Canton: Nantua
- Intercommunality: Haut-Bugey Agglomération

Government
  - Mayor (2026–32): Christophe Bernard
- Area^{1}: 3.49 km^{2} (1.35 sq mi)
- Elevation: 650 m (2,130 ft)
- Highest elevation: 754 m (2,474 ft)
- Lowest elevation: 567 m (1,860 ft)
- Population (2023): 852
  - Density: 244/km^{2} (632/sq mi)
- Time zone: UTC+01:00 (CET)
  - Summer (DST): UTC+02:00 (CEST)
- INSEE/Postal code: 01171 /01100
- ^{1} French Land Register data, which excludes lakes, ponds, glaciers > 1 km^{2} (0.386 sq mi or 247 acres) and river estuaries.

Géovreisset (French pronunciation: [ʒeɔvʁɛsɛ]) is a commune in the Ain department in eastern France.

== Population ==
Historical population
Year	Pop.	±% p.a.
1968	163	—
1975	228	+4.91%
1982	293	+3.65%
1990	450	+5.51%
1999	759	+5.98%
2007	887	+1.97%
2012	920	+0.73%
2017	874	−1.02%
2023	852	−0.42%
Source: INSEE

== See also ==
- Communes of the Ain department
