= Matafelon-Granges =

Commune in Auvergne-Rhône-Alpes, France

- Commune
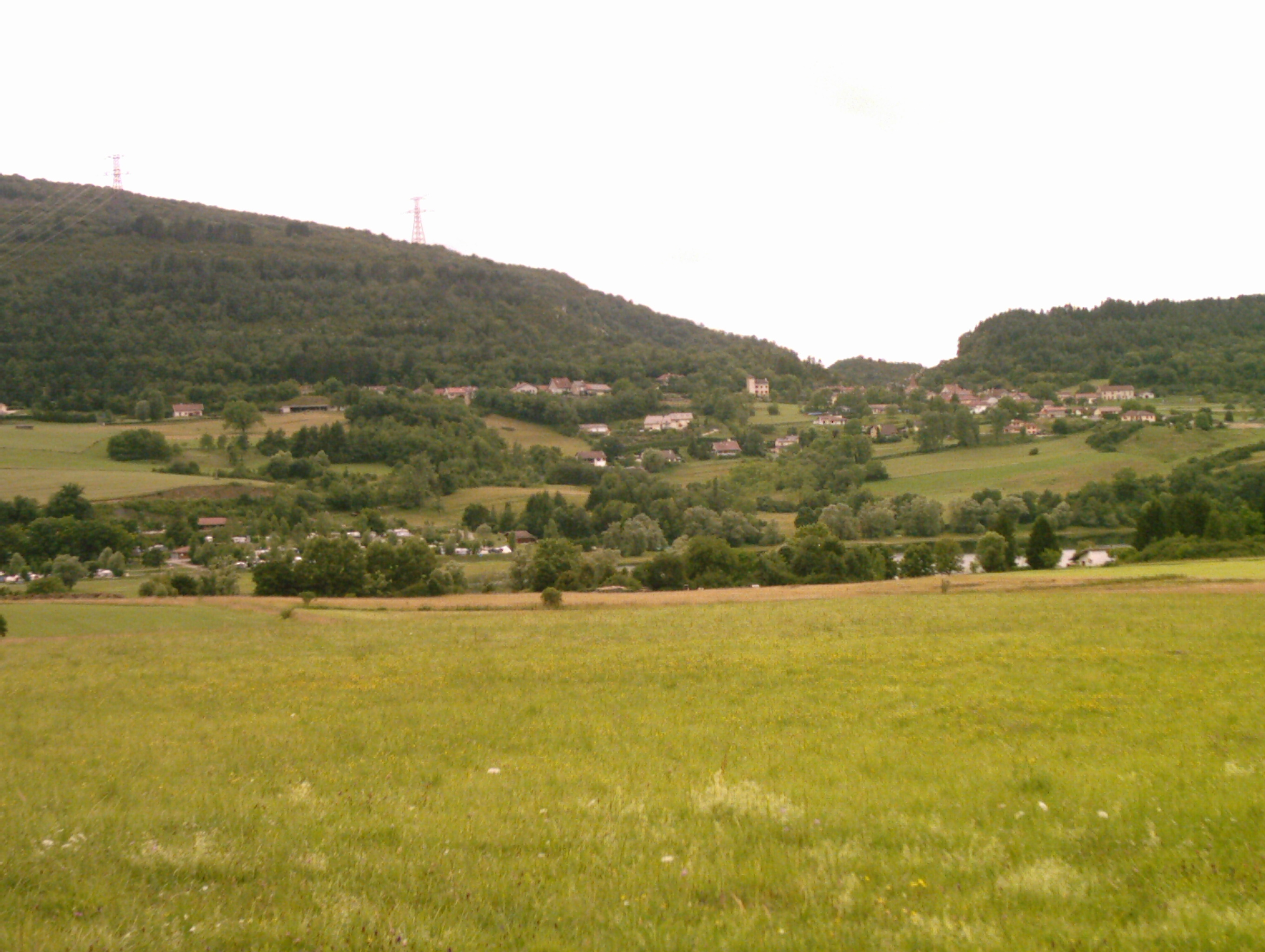
- Location of Matafelon-Granges
- Location within France Location within Auvergne-Rhône-Alpes
- Coordinates: 46°15′43″N 5°33′16″E
- Country: France
- Region: Auvergne-Rhône-Alpes
- Department: Ain
- Arrondissement: Nantua
- Canton: Pont-d'Ain
- Intercommunality: Haut-Bugey Agglomération

Government
  - Mayor (2026–32): Damien Glad
- Area^{1}: 21.54 km^{2} (8.32 sq mi)
- Elevation: 448 m (1,470 ft)
- Highest elevation: 783 m (2,569 ft)
- Lowest elevation: 267 m (876 ft)
- Population (2023): 623
  - Density: 28.9/km^{2} (74.9/sq mi)
- Time zone: UTC+01:00 (CET)
  - Summer (DST): UTC+02:00 (CEST)
- INSEE/Postal code: 01240 /01580
- ^{1} French Land Register data, which excludes lakes, ponds, glaciers > 1 km^{2} (0.386 sq mi or 247 acres) and river estuaries.

Matafelon-Granges (French pronunciation: [mataf(ə)lɔ̃ gʁɑ̃ʒ]) is a commune in the Ain department in eastern France. It was created in 1973 by the merger of two former communes: Matafelon and Granges.

== Population ==
Historical population
Year	Pop.	±% p.a.
1968	299	—
1975	296	−0.14%
1982	336	+1.83%
1990	406	+2.39%
1999	483	+1.95%
2007	647	+3.72%
2012	652	+0.15%
2017	641	−0.34%
2023	623	−0.47%
Source: INSEE

== See also ==
- Communes of the Ain department
