= Serrières-sur-Ain =

Commune in Auvergne-Rhône-Alpes, France

- Commune
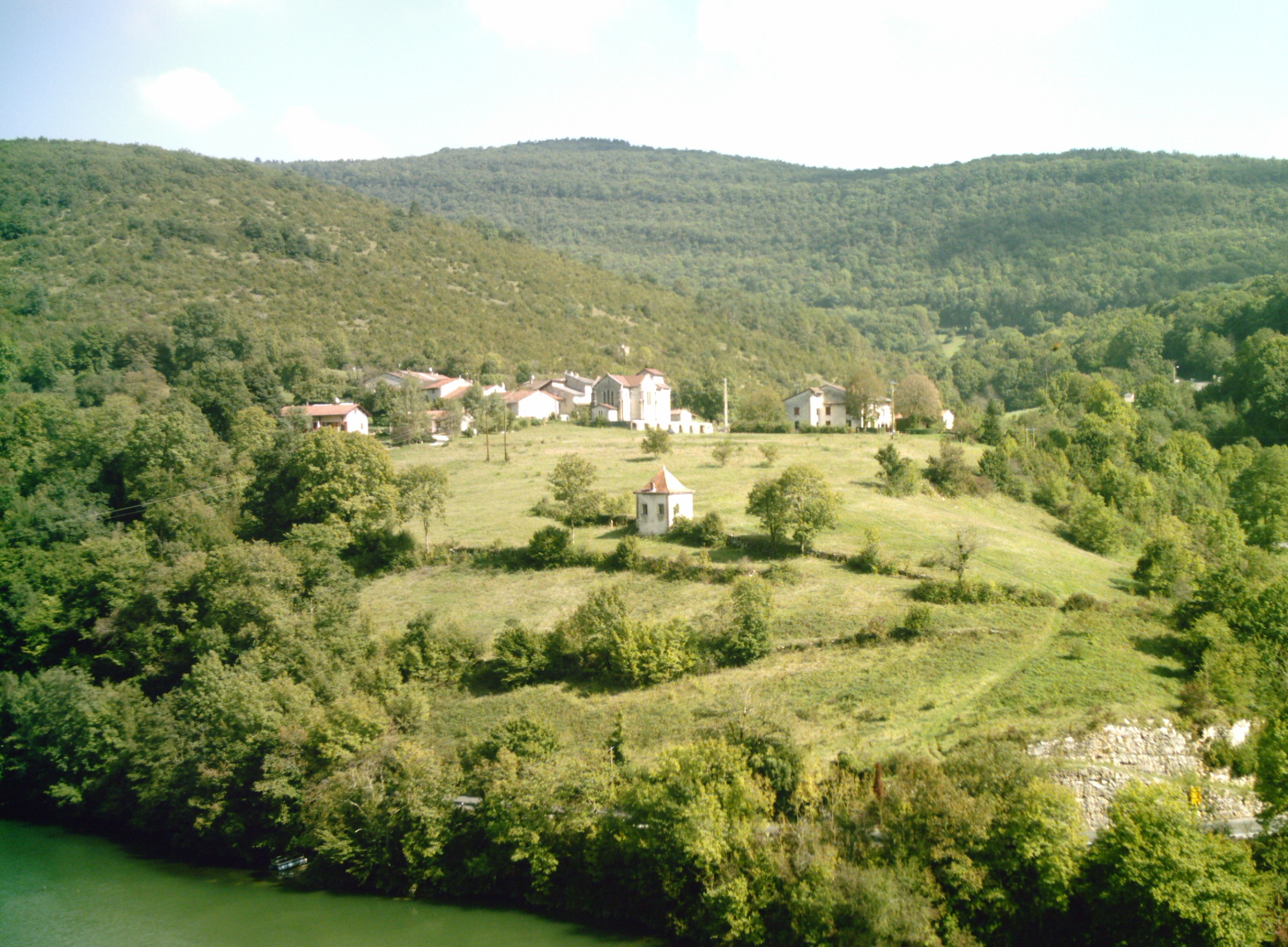
- Location of Serrières-sur-Ain
- Location within France Location within Auvergne-Rhône-Alpes
- Coordinates: 46°09′12″N 5°27′07″E
- Country: France
- Region: Auvergne-Rhône-Alpes
- Department: Ain
- Arrondissement: Nantua
- Canton: Pont-d'Ain

Government
  - Mayor (2026–32): Jérémy Bataille
- Area^{1}: 8.18 km^{2} (3.16 sq mi)
- Elevation: 245 m (804 ft)
- Highest elevation: 649 m (2,129 ft)
- Lowest elevation: 260 m (850 ft)
- Population (2023): 135
  - Density: 16.5/km^{2} (42.7/sq mi)
- Time zone: UTC+01:00 (CET)
  - Summer (DST): UTC+02:00 (CEST)
- INSEE/Postal code: 01404 /01450
- ^{1} French Land Register data, which excludes lakes, ponds, glaciers > 1 km^{2} (0.386 sq mi or 247 acres) and river estuaries.

Serrières-sur-Ain (French pronunciation: [sɛʁjɛʁ syʁ ɛ̃], literally Serrières on Ain) is a commune in the Ain department in eastern France.

== Population ==
Historical population
Year	Pop.	±% p.a.
1968	81	—
1975	63	−3.53%
1982	64	+0.23%
1990	71	+1.31%
1999	79	+1.19%
2007	115	+4.81%
2012	125	+1.68%
2017	134	+1.40%
2023	135	+0.12%
Source: INSEE

== See also ==
- Communes of the Ain department
