= Canton of Pont-d'Ain =

Coordinates: 46°03′03″N 5°20′06″E

Pont-d'Ain
- Canton
- Interactive map of Pont-d'Ain
- Country: France
- Region: Auvergne-Rhône-Alpes
- Department: Ain
- No. of communes: {{{nbcomm}}}
- Area: 308.40 km^{2} (119.07 sq mi)
- Population (2023): 22,578
  - Density: 73.210/km^{2} (189.61/sq mi)
- INSEE code: 01 16

The canton of Pont-d'Ain is an administrative division in eastern France. At the French canton reorganisation which came into effect in March 2015, the canton was expanded from 11 to 24 communes:

1. Bolozon
2. Boyeux-Saint-Jérôme
3. Ceignes
4. Cerdon
5. Challes-la-Montagne
6. Dortan
7. Izernore
8. Jujurieux
9. Labalme
10. Leyssard
11. Matafelon-Granges
12. Mérignat
13. Neuville-sur-Ain
14. Nurieux-Volognat
15. Peyriat
16. Poncin
17. Pont-d'Ain
18. Priay
19. Saint-Alban
20. Saint-Jean-le-Vieux
21. Samognat
22. Serrières-sur-Ain
23. Sonthonnax-la-Montagne
24. Varambon

== Demographics ==
Historical population
Year	Pop.	±% p.a.
2013	21,410	—
2018	21,997	+0.54%
Source: INSEE

== See also ==
- Cantons of the Ain department
- Communes of France
