= Formans =

River in eastern France

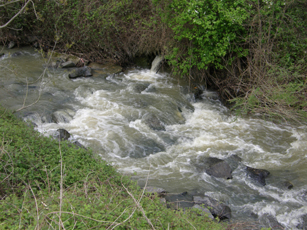

- Location within France Location within Auvergne-Rhône-Alpes

Location
- Country: France
- Region: Auvergne-Rhône-Alpes

Physical characteristics
- Source
  - location: Ambérieux-en-Dombes
  - coordinates: 45°59′23″N 4°53′15″E
  - elevation: 300 m (980 ft)
- Mouth: Saône
  - location: Saint-Didier-de-Formans, France
  - coordinates: 45°56′15″N 4°44′40″E
  - elevation: 170 m (560 ft)
- Length: 16.9 km (10.5 mi)

Basin features
- Progression: Saône→ Rhône→ Mediterranean Sea
- Tributaries
  - left: Morbier

The Formans (French pronunciation: [fɔʁmɑ̃]) is a small river in eastern France. It rises in the Dombes plateau in the Ain department and the Auvergne-Rhône-Alpes region. It flows into the Saône between Saint-Bernard and Trévoux. It is 16.9 km (10.5 mi) long.

== Communes traversed ==
The Formans, like its main tributary, the Morbier is a watercourse which links the ponds of the Dombes plateau with the Saône valley. It is fed by many bodies of water situated in Savigneux, Saint-Jean-de-Thurigneux and Ambérieux-en-Dombes at an altitude of 300m, which is the high point of its drainage basin. The Morbier in turn has its origin in ponds situated within the communes of Civieux bordering Saint-André-de-Corcy.

The Formans takes several names (ruisseau de la Pierre, ruisseau de l'Orme), collects other tributaries, and passes through Ars-sur-Formans and Misérieux, reaching its confluence with the Morbier at Sainte-Euphémie. The Morbier (Bief Mort / Bief lent) reaches Sainte Euphémie after passing through Rancé and Toussieux, receiving the Vignol and Caillates rivers and crossing the south of Misérieux.

The confluence with the Morbier at Sainte Euphémie is the most remarkable point on the Formans. The Morbier is channeled by a dam wall up to a great lock which creates a small forebay recently used in the mouturière industry. At this point the Formans receives the Morbier's entier volume. It then passes through Saint-Didier-de-Formans, dividing the south of Saint Bernard from the north of Trévoux, to reach the Saône. Its mouth is situated at an altitude of 170m.

== See also ==
- List of rivers of France
