= Canton of Reyrieux =

Coordinates: 45°56′N 4°49′E

Reyrieux
- Former canton
- Interactive map of Reyrieux
- Country: France
- Region: Auvergne-Rhône-Alpes
- Department: Ain
- No. of communes: {{{nbcomm}}}
- Disbanded: 2015
- Area: 142.77 km^{2} (55.12 sq mi)
- Population (2012): 22,954
  - Density: 160.78/km^{2} (416.41/sq mi)

The canton of Reyrieux is a former administrative division in eastern France. It was disbanded following the French canton reorganisation which came into effect in March 2015. It had 22,954 inhabitants (2012).

The canton comprised 13 communes:

- Ars-sur-Formans
- Civrieux
- Massieux
- Mionnay
- Misérieux
- Parcieux
- Rancé
- Reyrieux
- Saint-André-de-Corcy
- Sainte-Euphémie
- Saint-Jean-de-Thurigneux
- Toussieux
- Tramoyes

== Demographics ==
Historical population Canton of Reyrieux
Year	1962	1968	1975	1982	1990	1999
Pop.	5,695	6,028	7,544	12,353	15,646	19,957
±%	—	+5.8%	+25.1%	+63.7%	+26.7%	+27.6%
From the year 1962 on: No double counting – residents of multiple communes (e.g. students and military personnel) are counted only once. Source: INSEE

== See also ==
- Cantons of the Ain department
