= Saint-Bernard Castle =

Castle in France

- Château de Saint-Bernard
- Saint-Bernard, Ain, Auvergne-Rhône-Alpes, France; 45.944536°N 4.73266°E
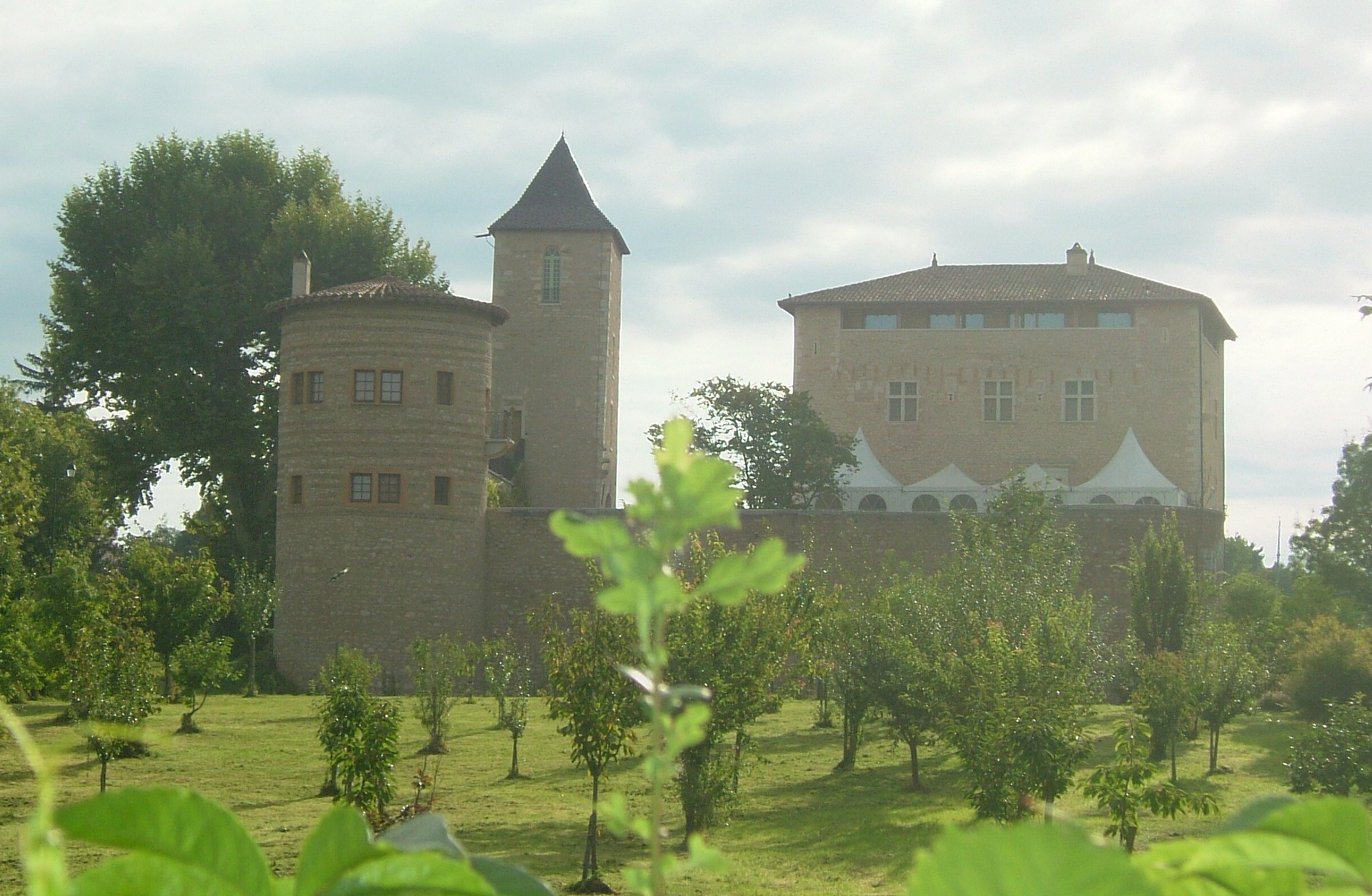

Site information
- Type: Castle

Site history
- Built: late 13th or early 14th century
- Built by: Palatines family of Riottiers

The Saint-Bernard Castle is an old castle in France. It was from the late 13th or early 14th century. It was remodeled in the 17th and restored in the 19th century. It is centre of the seigneury of Saint-Barnard, which stands on the territory of the French commune of Saint-Bernard, in the department of Ain in the Auvergne-Rhône-Alpes region. The castle is listed as a monument historique(historical monument of France).

== Location ==
The castle is located in the commune of Saint-Bernard, in the French department of Ain.

== History ==
The castle of Saint-Barnard was originally the property of the Palatines of Riottiers. It already existed at the beginning of the 13th century. William Palatine sold it in 1250 to Guichard V, Lord of Beaujeu, who then sold it, along with all its dependencies, to Church of Lyon for 6,050 livres in May 1264.

The castle was taken by force and pillaged in 1376 by the inhabitants of Trévoux and Reyrieux, and in 1468, by the troops that the lord of Sornas was leading to the Count of Comminges, governor of the Dauphiné, marching in the name of Louis XI against Philip of Savoy, Count of Bresse.

The Church of Lyon enjoyed the lordship of Saint-Barnard until 1599, when it alienated it to Martin de Covet, lord of Montribloud, whose descendants still possessed it in 1801.

The castle, which still largely survives, was acquired in 1801 by Quirin-Henri de Cazenove who sold it to Daniel Bellet de Tavernost in 1808. His daughter Louise-Augustine, wife of Gabriel Bourlier, Baron d'Ailly, inherited it, before it passed to their daughter, Marie-Thérèse, wife of Count Jules de Murat de Lestang. In 1917, it was bought by Antoine Goujot-Pontet d'Amplepuis who sold it in 1923 to the painters André Utter and Suzanne Valadon, whose son, the painter Maurice Utrillo, depicted the castle, the church, and the village restaurant on several occasions, and he kept it until 1948.

== Description ==
The old castle from the end of the 13th or beginning of the 14th century, was remodeled in the 17th century, and restored in the 19th century.

In 1873, Saint-Bernard was enclosed by walls and surrounded by ditches. Only two gates was allowed to access. (Note: Salch hesitates regarding these two gates; are they gates of the city walls or gates of the castle?) The arch of one of these gates still exists; the other is in ruins.

In the 21st century, the Saint-Bernard Castle appears as a rectangular enclosure flanked on one of its short sides by two round corner towers, and on the opposite side by a tall main building, formerly crowned by a corbelled parapet walk. Access to the courtyard is through a square gate tower which opens in the middle of one of the long sides.

== Protection of historical monuments ==
The castle, including the outer bailey and the area of the former moats, is listed as a historical monument by April 10, 1997.

=== Related articles ===
- fr:Famille de Beaujeu
- fr:Liste des monuments historiques de l'Ain
- fr:Liste des châteaux de l'Ain

== Notes and references ==
=== Sources ===
- Guigue, Marie-Claude (1873). Topographie historique du département de l'Ain (in French). Bourg-en-Bresse: Gromier Ainé.
