= Ars-sur-Formans =

Commune in Auvergne-Rhône-Alpes, France

- Commune
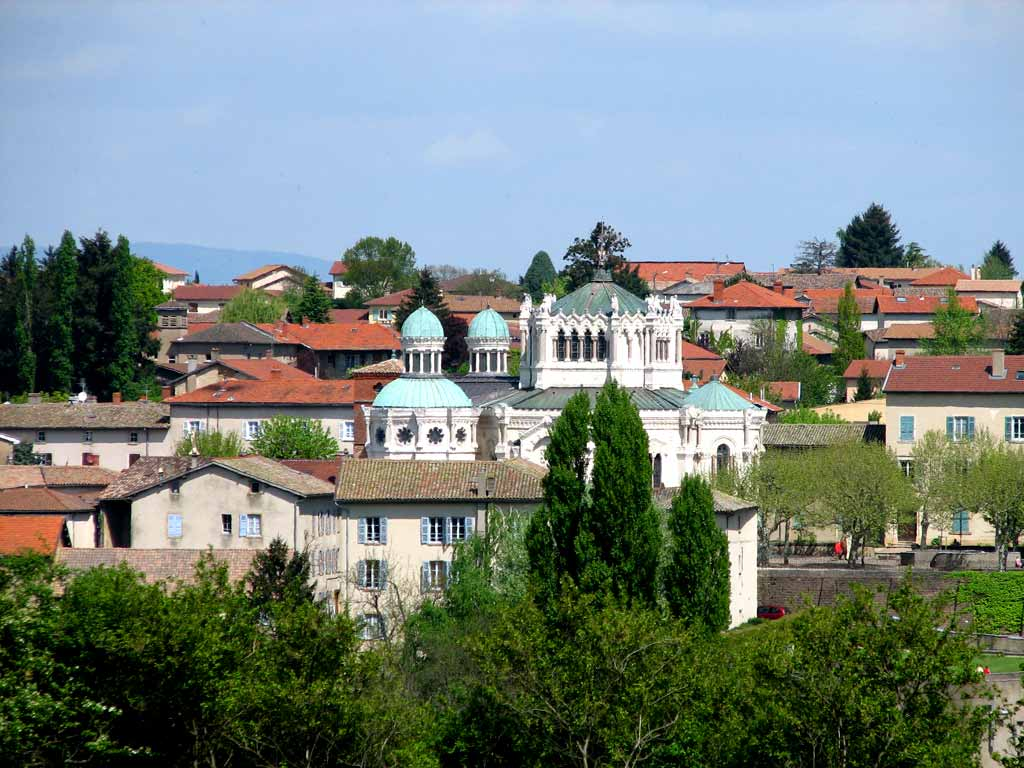

- Coat of arms
- Location of Ars-sur-Formans
- Location within France Location within Auvergne-Rhône-Alpes
- Coordinates: 45°59′34″N 4°49′25″E
- Country: France
- Region: Auvergne-Rhône-Alpes
- Department: Ain
- Arrondissement: Bourg-en-Bresse
- Canton: Villars-les-Dombes
- Intercommunality: Dombes-Saône Vallée

Government
  - Mayor (2026–32): Thierry Delamare
- Area^{1}: 5.50 km^{2} (2.12 sq mi)
- Elevation: 240 m (790 ft)
- Highest elevation: 281 m (922 ft)
- Lowest elevation: 226 m (741 ft)
- Population (2023): 1,528
  - Density: 278/km^{2} (720/sq mi)
- Time zone: UTC+01:00 (CET)
  - Summer (DST): UTC+02:00 (CEST)
- INSEE/Postal code: 01021 /01480
- Website: https://ars-sur-formans.fr/
- ^{1} French Land Register data, which excludes lakes, ponds, glaciers > 1 km^{2} (0.386 sq mi or 247 acres) and river estuaries.

Ars-sur-Formans is a commune in the Ain department in the Auvergne-Rhône-Alpes region of eastern France.

== Geography ==
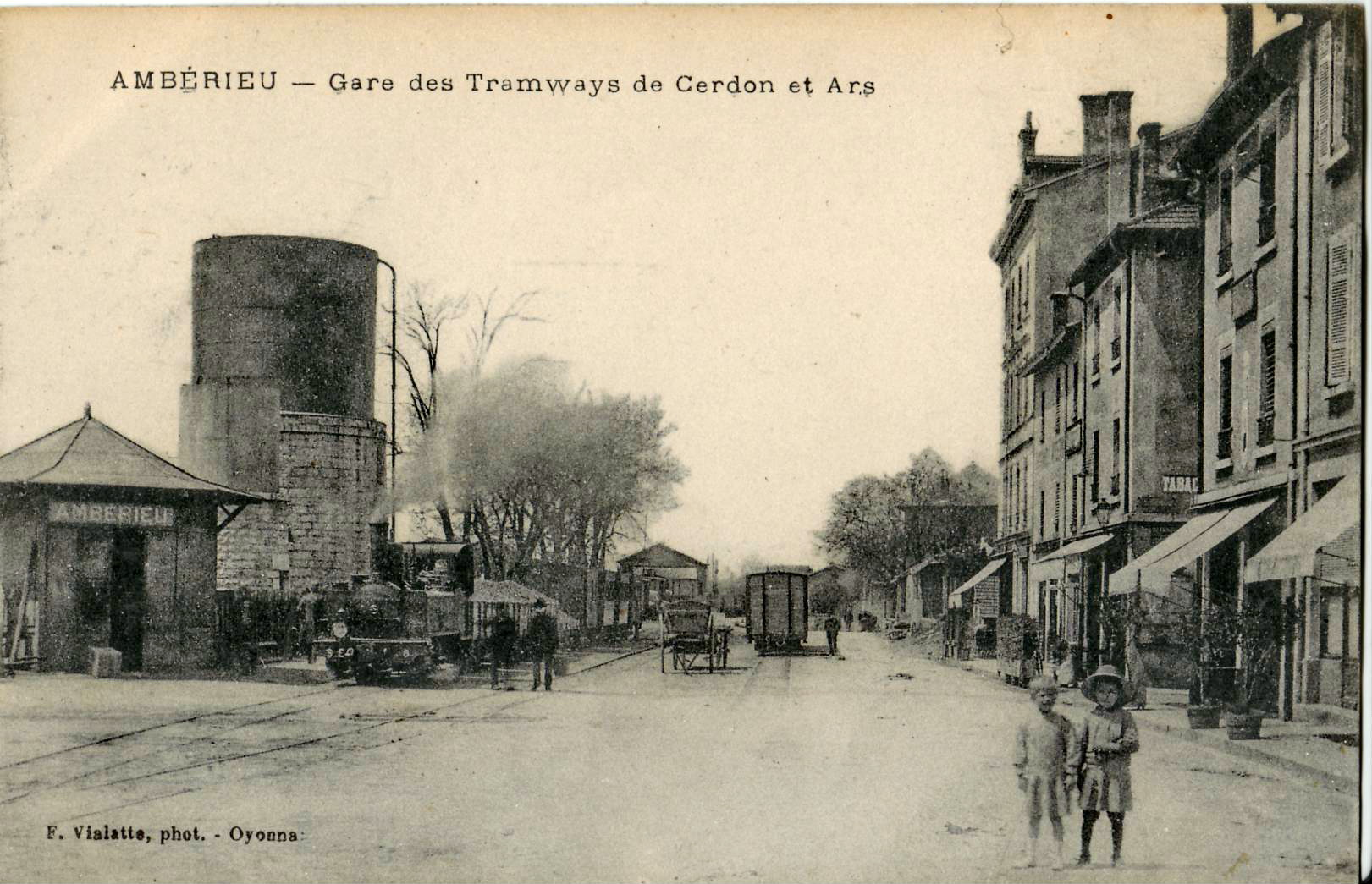
The town was served by a metre-gauge Tramway from 1897 to 1951, from Ambérieu and Cerdon

The village is in the south-western part of the Ain department 33 km north of Lyon and 10 km east of Villefranche-sur-Saône in the heart of the Dombes region, which is known for its many lagoons. Ars-sur-Formans is on the Dombes Plateau, while to the west it borders the fertile hills of the Val de Saône. A small river, the Formans, runs from east to west across the commune just south of the village to join the Saône River near Saint-Bernard. The commune covers 5.50 km^{2} (2.12 sq mi).

The D44 road from Savigneux west to Beauregard forms much of the northern border of the commune. Access to the village is by road D904 going west from Savigneux and continuing to join the D934 west of the commune. The road D888 also runs south-east of the village to Rancé.

=== Toponymy ===
The name of the commune comes from arsa ("burnt"). Long known simply as Ars, the commune changed its name to Ars-sur-Formans by a decree dated 12 October 1956, published in the Official Journal on the 18th of the same month.

== History ==
The name Ars appeared as early as the year 969. In the 11th century, Ars was one of the many strongholds of the Lordship of Villars and his mansion was located next to the church. In 1226, Jean of Ars sold his land to the monastery of Île Barbe, but Villars retained sovereignty. In the 14th century, the protection of the castle was divided between the Lord of Villars and that of Beaujeu.

The village was burned by the troops of Viry in 1409 and was obliged to submit to the consequences of the Wars of Religion throughout the following century.

The parish of Ars belonged to the Principality of Dombes and the Châtellenie of Trévoux before being absorbed with all of the Dombes into the Kingdom of France in 1762.

In 1790, Ars was made a commune of the Ain Department. It was part of the canton of Trévoux until 1984, when it was attached to the canton of Reyrieux. In 2015 it became part of the canton of Villars-les-Dombes.

Since the mid-19th century, the name of Ars is associated with Jean-Marie Vianney, the former parish priest venerated as a saint by the Catholic Church. Well before his 1925 canonisation by Pope Pius XI, there were already many pilgrimages to the town. On 6 October 1986, Pope John Paul II travelled to Ars-sur-Formans as part of his third visit to France.

=== Heraldry ===
| Arms of Ars-sur-Formans | Blazon: Paly of six Or and Azure. |

== Administration ==
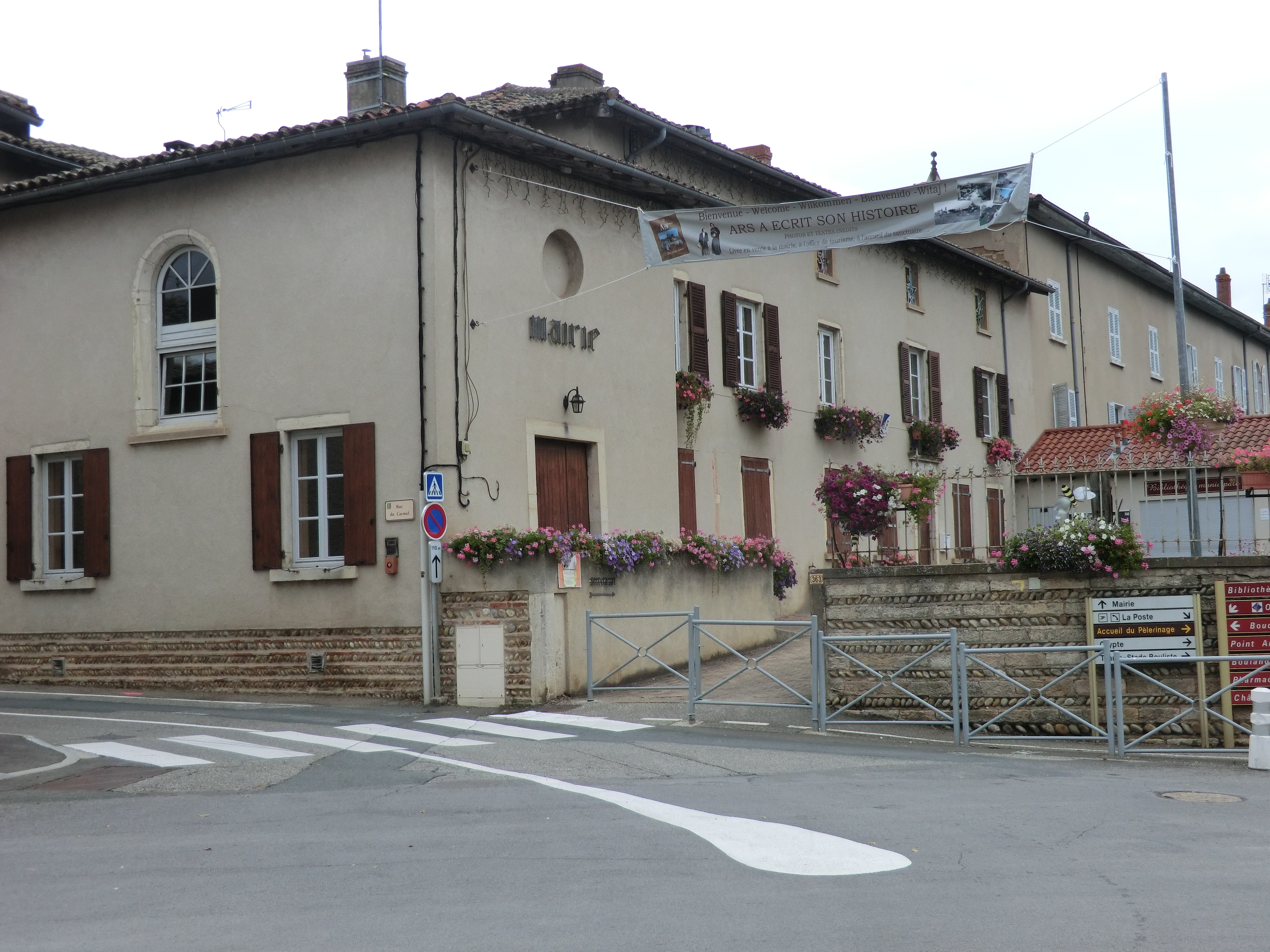
The Town Hall

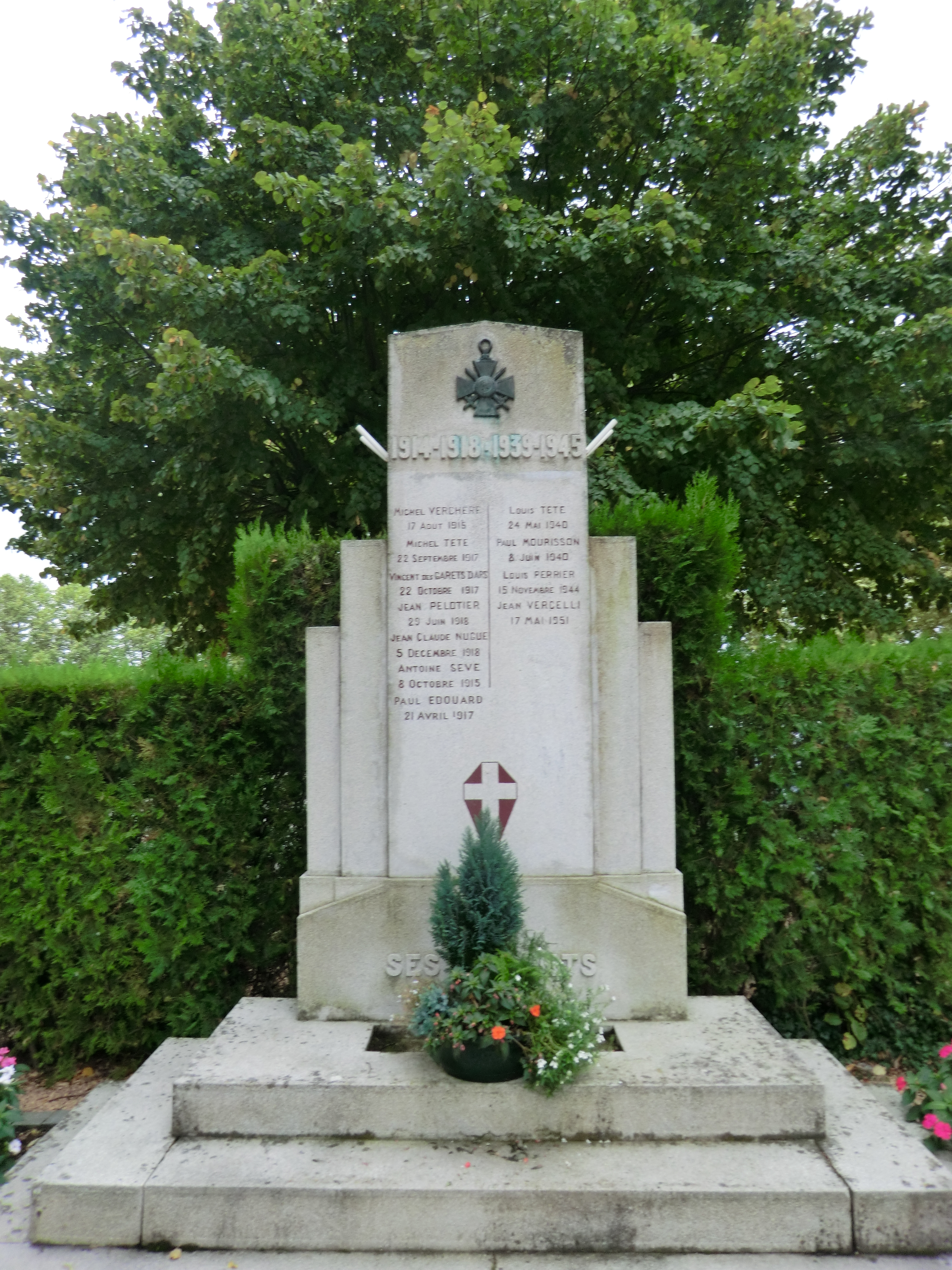
The War Memorial

List of Mayors of Ars-sur-Formans

| From | To | Name |
|---|---|---|
| ? | 1808 | François Cinier |
| 1808 | 1815 | Antoine Mandy |
| 1815 | 1821 | Michel Sève |
| 1821 | 1831 | Antoine Mandy |
| 1831 | 1838 | Michel Sève |
| 1838 | 1879 | Claude Prosper Garnier des Garets |
| 1879 | 1884 | Gaspard Sève |
| 1884 | 1896 | Jean-Baptiste Mandy-Trève |
| 1896 | 1904 | Michel Verchère |
| 1904 | 1912 | André Benoît Trève |
| 1912 | 1915 | Jean-François Cinier Trève |
| 1915 | 1919 | Jean-Claude Mandy |
| 1919 | 1944 | Jean-François Cinier Trève |
| 1944 | 1945 | Louis Gillet |
| 1945 | 1947 | Antoine Mandy Demole |
| 1947 | 1965 | Pierre Paturel |
| 1965 | 1977 | Jean-Claude Dupont |
| 1977 | 1983 | André Gillet |
| 1983 | 1995 | Henri Dutruge |
| 1995 | 2008 | Patrick Sandron |
| 2008 | 2014 | Patrick Duvivier |
| 2014 | 2026 | Richard Paccaud |
| 2026 | Present | Thierry Delamare |

=== Twinning ===
Ars-sur-Formans has twinning associations with:

- Freihalden (Germany) since 1977.

== Population ==
Historical population
| Year | Pop. | ±% p.a. |
|---|---|---|
| 1968 | 496 | — |
| 1975 | 480 | −0.47% |
| 1982 | 719 | +5.94% |
| 1990 | 851 | +2.13% |
| 1999 | 1,102 | +2.91% |
| 2007 | 1,264 | +1.73% |
| 2012 | 1,380 | +1.77% |
| 2017 | 1,408 | +0.40% |
| 2023 | 1,528 | +1.37% |
Source: INSEE

== Culture and heritage ==
=== Civil heritage ===
The commune has many sites that are registered as historical monuments:

- The Park on the Chemin de Chateau
- The Girls' School and Orphanage of Providence (1827)
- A House at Rue des Ecoles (19th century)
- A School at Rue des Ecoles (1906)
- A House at Rue Jean-Marie Vianney (19th century)
- The Town Hall / School at Rue Jean-Marie Vianney (1840)
- The Sainte-Philomène Garden at Rue Jean-Marie Vianney
- The Chateau des Garets Park
- The Sainte-Anne Farmhouse at Champ du Chateau (19th century)

=== Religious heritage ===
The commune has several religious buildings and structures that are registered as historical monuments:

- The Croix des Combes (Combes Cross) (1853)
- The Monumental Cross of the 1847 Jubilee (1847)
- The Croix Micholet (Micholet Cross) (1612)
- The Croix Tonneau (Tonneau Cross) (18th century)
- The Presbytery for the Priest of Ars (18th century)
- The former Church and Basilica (12th century)
- The Garnier des Garets family Tomb (1856)
- The Presbytery (1886)
- The Presbytery of Saint Curé d'Ars (18th century) The presbytery and chapel containing the preserved heart relic of Saint Jean-Marie Vianney are now a museum open to visitors. The sanctuary and its activities are managed by the Benedictine Tyburn Nuns and the Brothers of the Holy Family of Belley. 2009 marked the 150th death anniversary of Vianney; it was part of the Year for Priests that ended in 2010, and during that period the sanctuary hosted nearly 600,000 pilgrims including 35,000 priests. The Historial du Saint-Curé-d'Ars depicts the life story of the saint using 35 wax figures in 17 scenes, with period décor. Ars is part of the Association of Sanctuaries in France, holding the title "Tourist Village of Ain".
- The Parish Church of Saint-Sixte (11th century) The Basilica of Ars, partly built in 1862 by the Lyon architect Pierre Bossan and his successor Sainte-Marie-Perrin, forms an extension to the old church. It enshrines the tomb of Saint Jean-Marie Vianney, who is honoured as the patron saint of all parish priests. The basilica hosts more than 500,000 visitors annually.
- The Tomb of the heart of Jean-Marie Vianney (1932)

The commune has a very large number of religious items that are registered as historical objects.

== Local life ==
=== Religious communities ===
- Several Catholic religious communities are present in Ars: the Working Missionary Sisters (Providence House); the Franciscan Sisters (Saint-Jean House); the Carmelite Sisters; the Benedictines of the Sacred Heart of Montmartre; the Brothers of the Holy Family of Belley; and priests of the Jean-Marie Vianney Society (who use the John Paul II Sacred Hall to receive priests and operate an international seminary).
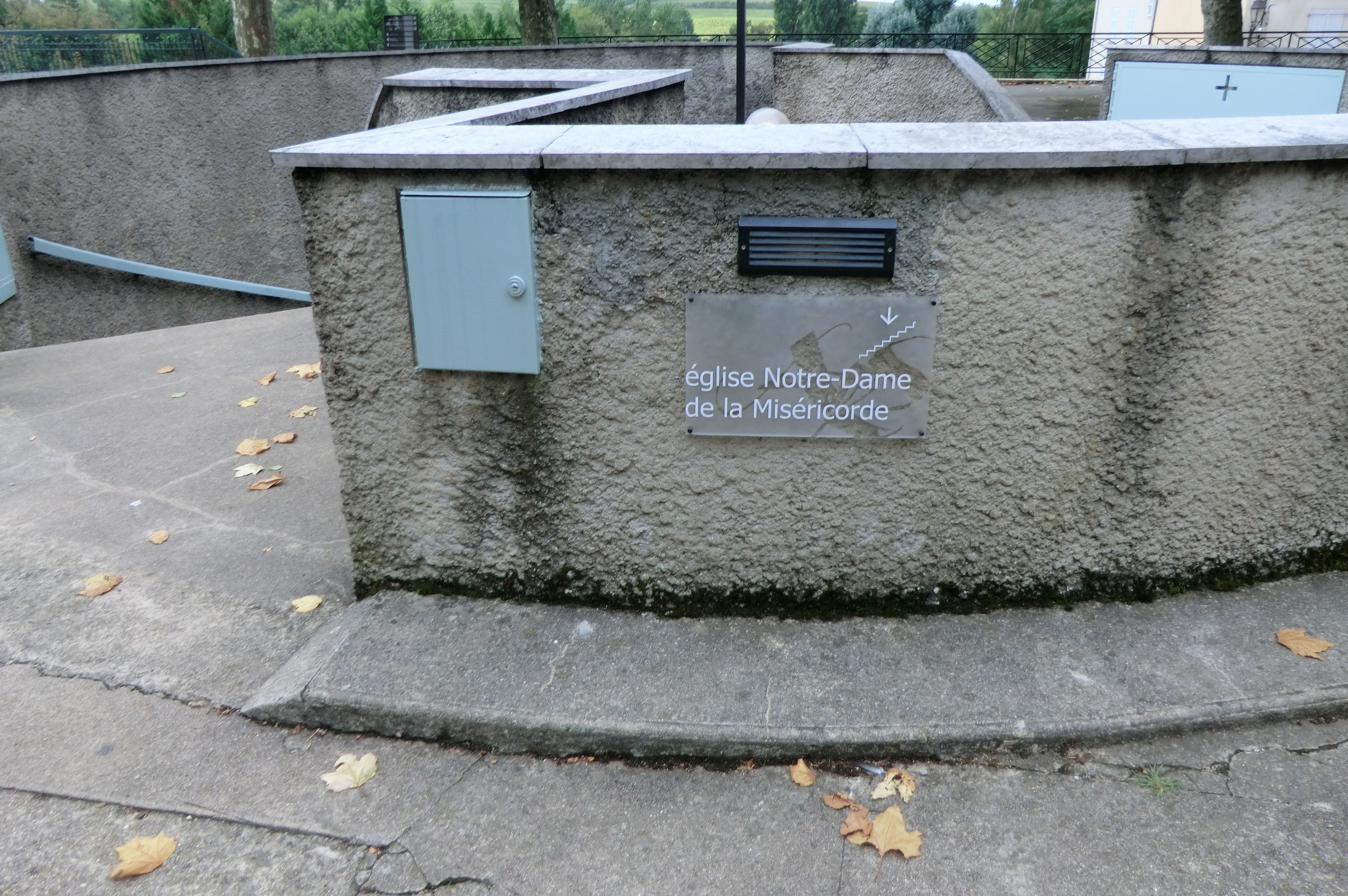
Entrance to the underground Church of Notre-Dame-de-la-Miséricorde

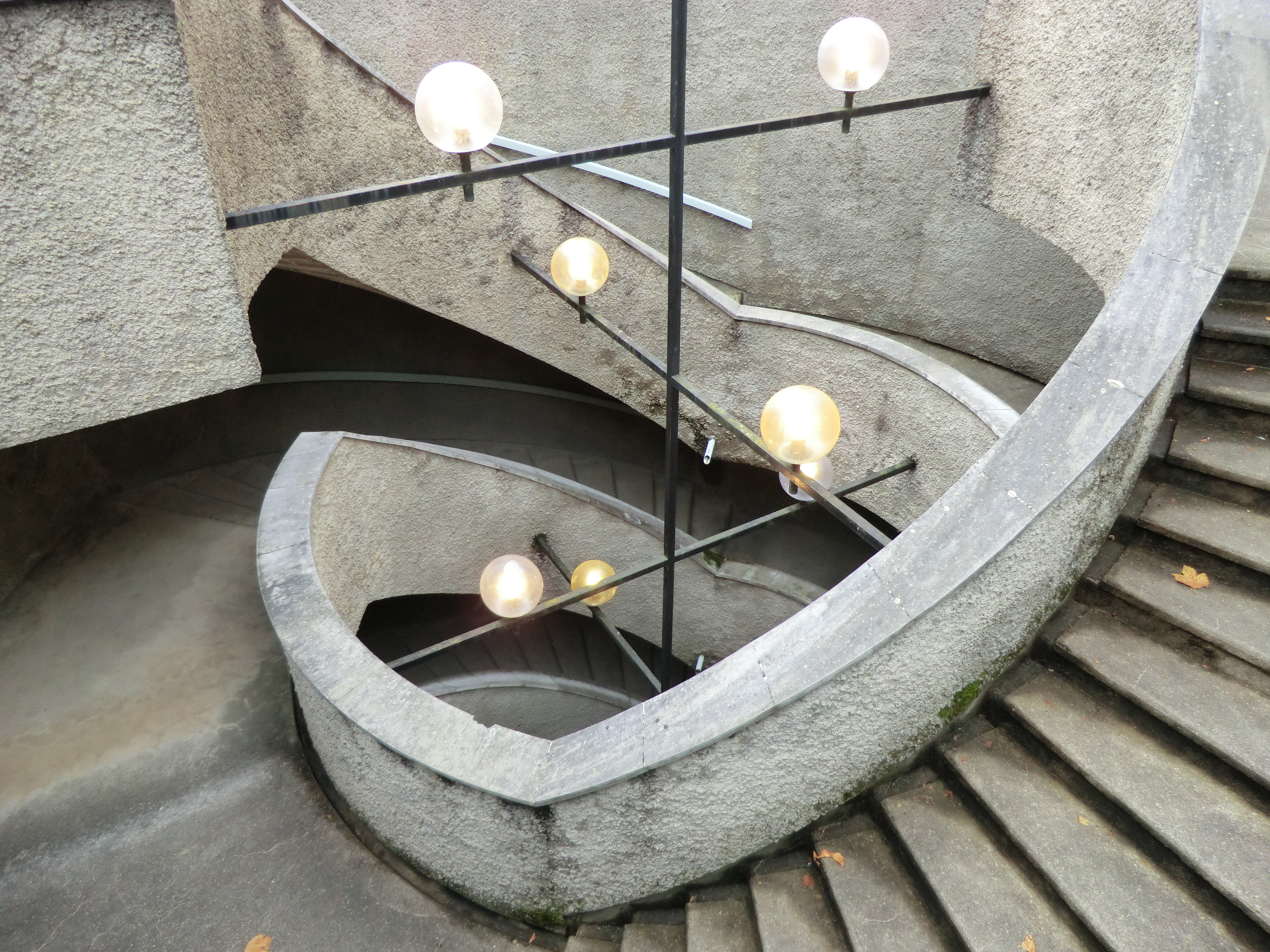
Staircase to the underground Church of Notre-Dame-de-la-Miséricorde

=== Events ===
- Second Sunday in February: Feast of the Arrival of the Saint – recalls the arrival of Vianney at the Meeting Monument. Features solemn Mass, procession, adoration of the Blessed Sacrament, and vespers with catechism.
- The Second Sunday of Easter (the octave day of Easter Sunday, or Divine Mercy Sunday): Mass, education, vespers
- All Wednesdays in June: Groups of children at home (Mass, visits, games)
- May or June: Feast of Corpus Christi – Mass and solemn procession
- 4 August (Vianney's death anniversary): Festival of the Holy Curé – lauds, Mass and procession, adoration of the Blessed Sacrament, vespers, and a spiritual music concert
- 8 December: Feast of the Immaculate Conception – the village is decorated with many lights, and entertainment is available throughout the day.

Event at the Carmel of the Holy Curé of Ars (founded 1939)

- In 1986 and 2007, the movie-art-recreation association made two films about Carmel of the Holy Curé of Ars in the film series "Relief of France: the Monasteries" and a paper on John Paul II, during his meeting with the Carmelites on 6 October 1986.

== Personalities ==
- Jean-Marie Vianney, parish priest venerated as a saint by the Catholic Church

== See also ==
- Communes of the Ain department
