= Lise Berthaud =

French violist

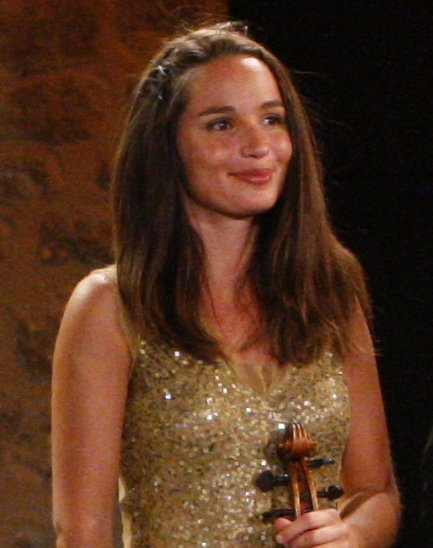
Lise Berthaud (2009).

Lise Berthaud (born 1982) is a French violist.

== Early life ==
Berthaud was born in Bourg-en-Bresse in the Ain department in south-east France on the Swiss border, in the Rhône-Alpes region. She grew up in Sainte-Euphémie. Her father is the headmaster of a school in Jassans-Riottier, and her mother is a teacher in Trévoux.

She started learning the violin aged 5 at a music school at Villefranche-sur-Saône. She changed to viola at age 12. She attended Lycée du Val de Saone in Trévoux. She studied with Pierre-Henri Xuereb at the Conservatoire National Supérieur de Paris (Paris Conservatory) in the 12th arrondissement of Paris. She won a prize in the Eurovision Young Musicians 2000 (Concours Eurovision des jeunes musiciens). In the Victoires de la musique classique (a category of the Victoires de la Musique) in January 2009, she was nominated for Revelation Instrumental Soloist of the Year (Révélation instrumentale de l’Année), which was broadcast on France Inter and France Musique (radio), and on France 3 (television).

== Career ==
In 2006, Berthaud was invited to perform with the Japanese conductor Seiji Ozawa in his string quartet (Quatuor à Cordes) in Switzerland. She went on international tour with Augustin Dumay in a sinfonia concertante (Symphonie Concertante). She has toured with Emmanuel Krivine with his Orchestre Français des Jeunes. She has been part of the BBC Radio 3 New Generation Artists scheme.

=== Orchestras ===
- Düsseldorf Symphony Orchestra (Orchestre symphonique de Düsseldorf)
- Iceland Symphony Orchestra (Orchestre symphonique d'Islande)
- Orchestre de chambre de Paris (Ensemble orchestral de Paris)
- Sinfonia Varsovia

== Performances ==
=== Proms ===
- Wednesday 10 September 2014 (Prom 72) with the Violin Concerto (Walton) with the BBC Symphony Orchestra (Andrew Litton)
- Monday 29 August 2016 at the Cadogan Hall, with String Quintet No. 3 (Mozart) and with a piece by the British composer Sally Beamish with the Armida Quartet.

== See also ==
- European Union Youth Orchestra
- List of symphony orchestras in Europe
- Category:Compositions for viola
