= Vermorel =

French Engineering Business

Établissements V. Vermorel
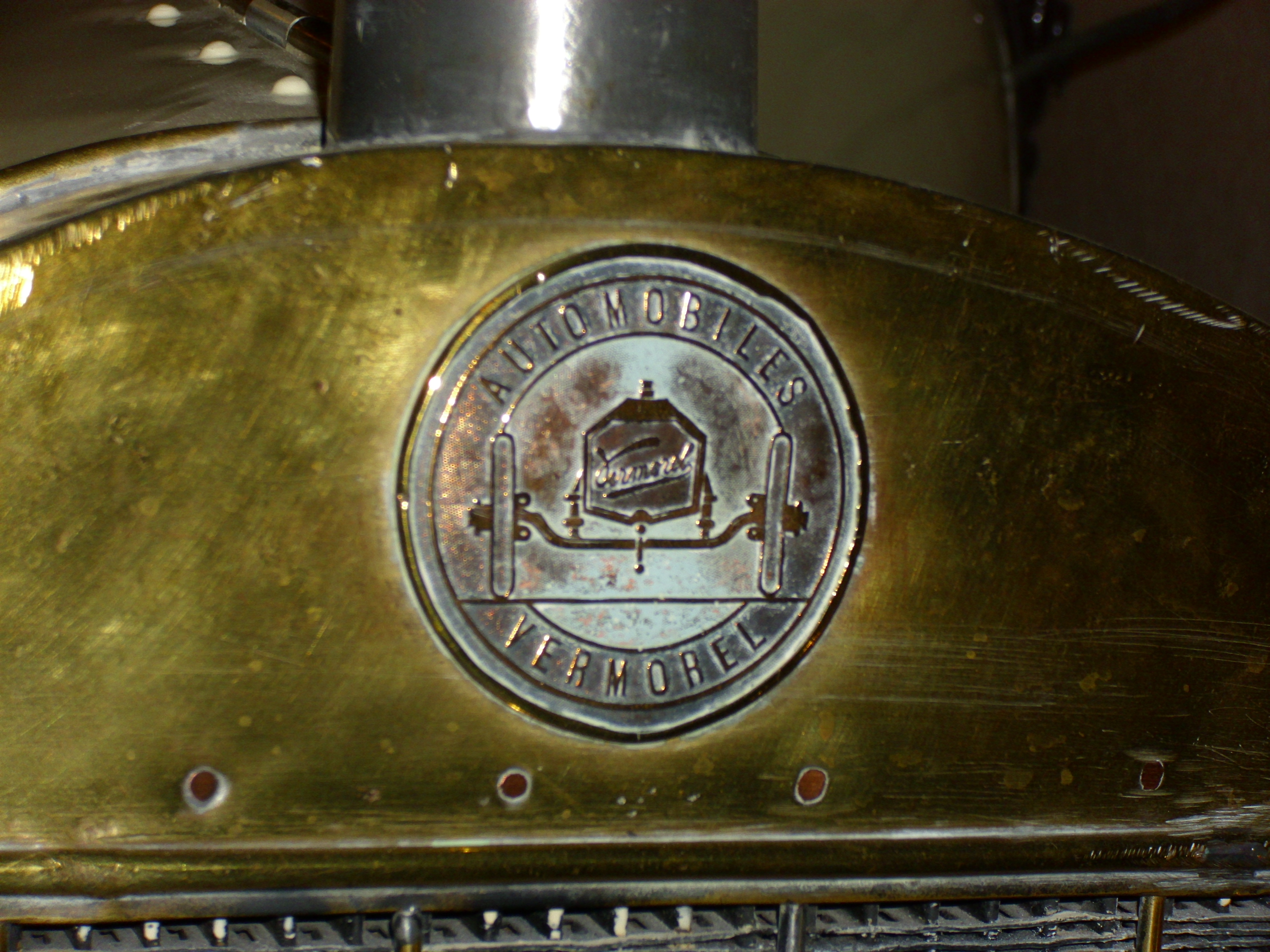

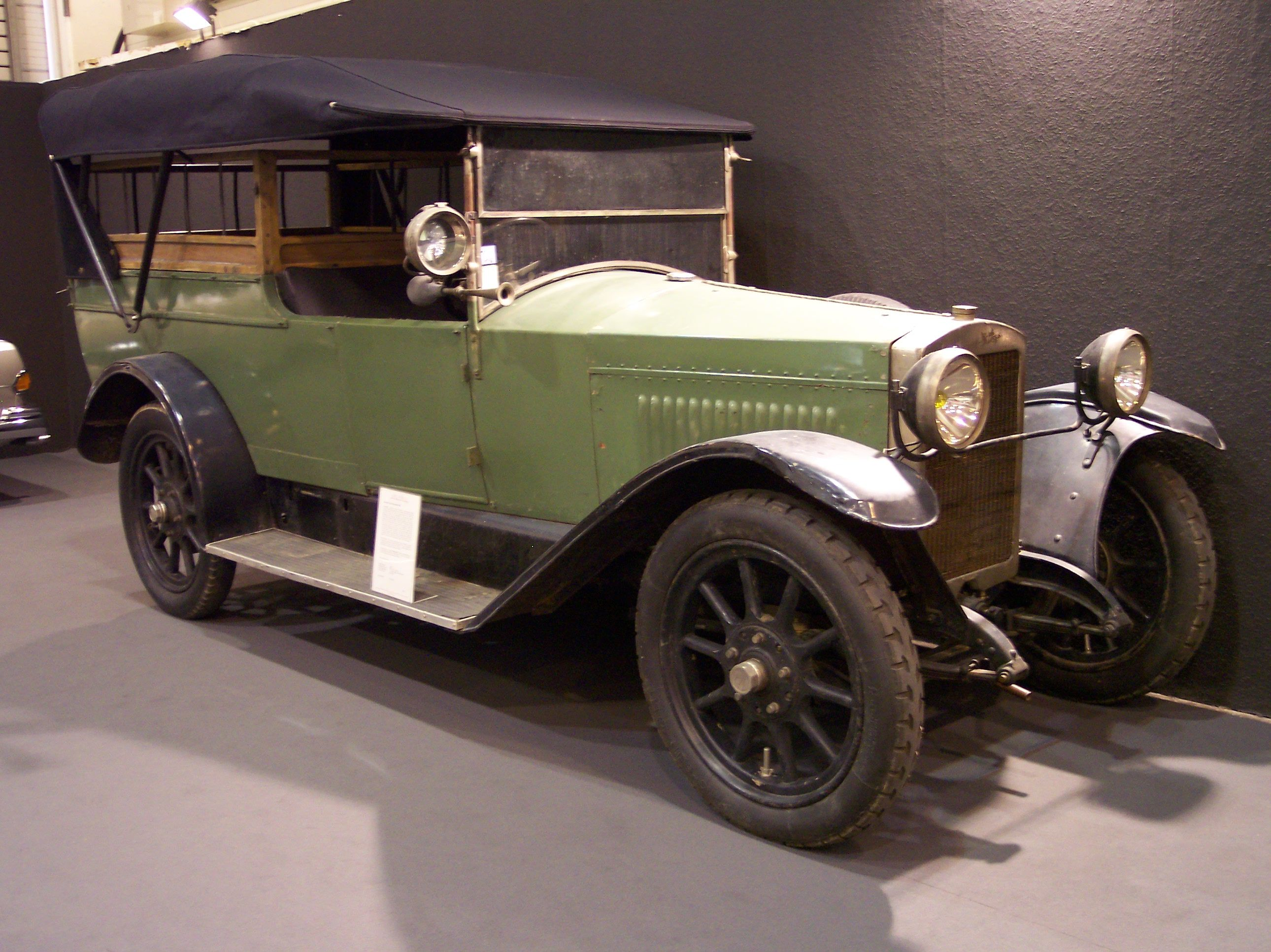
- Founded: 1850
- Defunct: 1965
- Headquarters: Villefranche-sur-Saône, France
- Key people: Victor Vermorel(1848–1927); François Pilain (1859–1924); Claude Givaudan (1872–1945); Édouard Vermorel (−1957)
- Products: Diverse engineered products Notably, Automobiles 1908–1930

Établissements V. Vermorel was a French engineering business that existed between 1850 and 1965: for more than a century, until the death in 1957 of Édouard Vermorel, it was a family-run business.

The company presented its first automobile in 1899, but waited for some years before becoming a regular automobile producer. Between 1908 and 1930 Vermorel was noteworthy as an automobile manufacturer, and commercial vehicle production continued till 1932.

== Origins ==
The origins of Vermorel go back at least to the business set up in 1843 by Antoine Vermorel in a small village called Beauregard, in the countryside up-river of Lyon. Vermorel manufactured agricultural machinery: products included a successful threshing machine.

Most sources date the start of the business at 1850 which is when activities were relocated across the river to larger premises at Villefranche-sur-Saône. The focus was on agricultural equipment and machinery for wood-working. Antoine Morel's son, Victor, joined the business in 1863. At the end of the nineteenth century activity was still concentrated on agricultural equipment, notably a machine for spraying sulphur based insecticides and fungicides in the region's vineyards, still recovering from the destruction wrought by the Phylloxera plague during the 1870s and 1880s.

The company was nevertheless keen to diversify, and automobiles were seen as a promising growth sector. A key role in Vermorel's beginnings as an automaker was played by François Pilain (1859–1924), chiefly remembered in retrospect as the uncle of Emile Pilain. During the closing decades of the nineteenth century François Pilain worked for pioneering automobile companies such as Serpollet and La Buire. In 1897 he established his own automobile business, the "Société François Pilain", but he almost immediately abandoned this project in order to join Victor Vermorel's established engineering company, with the mandate to create the Vermorel automobile division. Under Pilain's leadership, the first Vermorel prototype was ready to be exhibited in March 1899 at the Lyon Fair. It featured a twin cylinder engine which delivered power to the rear wheels via a chain-drive mechanism. Several more Vermorel cars had been developed and constructed by the time the project came to a temporary halt in August 1901. Assisted during this period by his nephew, Pilain experimented with various innovative transmission mechanisms:it is therefore surprising that when, some years later, Vermorel automobiles went into production, they featured conventional chain-based transmissions. In August 1901, after working with Vermorel for slightly under four years, Pilain left in order to try again establishing his own automobile manufacturing business, setting himself up at a premises at 51 rue de l'Abondance in nearby Lyon. His new business was registered as the "Société des Automobiles Pilain" (more commonly known as "SAP"). Pilain's business in Lyon made interesting progress, but it needed funding, and Pilain's agreement with his investors seems to have led to a loss of control that after seven years enabled him to be forced out of his business, following disagreements over spending priorities.

In Pilain's absence, Vermorel's ambitions to become an auto-maker apparently lapsed, but in 1908 the project was reinvigorated and Vermorel emerged as a regular automobile producer.

== Before the war ==
During the early years of the twentieth century France was the world's leading automobile producer and the years from 1908 to 1914 were boom years for the sector: by 1911 Vermorel was employing 800 people. The first production model, in 1908, owed less to Pilain than to a talented engineer called Claude Givaudan who had joined the company in the meantime and who designed the chassis. The manufacturer's first production model used a 1.8-litre 4-cylinder T-head engine with a four speed transmission and three-quarter-elliptic rear suspension. A proliferation of Givaudan designs followed, though some proved very ephemeral, and it is not till approximately 1911 that a relatively stable Vermorel automobile range can be identified.

By 1912 Vermorel were offering cars with engine sizes of 2.2 and 3.3 litre capacity. The T-head engine configuration was by now already seen as rather old fashioned, and in 1913 the manufacturer introduced L-head engine designs for their "8/10 CV" and "16/20 CV" with engine capacities of respectively 1.5 and 2.8 litres. The similarly configured "12/16 CV" 2.3 litre engined version that appeared a year later was Vermorel's last new model before the war (and would be the first model to reappear when hostilities ended over four years later).

== After the war ==
Less than a year after the outbreak of peace, the Vermorel company was focused on a single model, the "Vermorel Type S" of 12/16HP which sat on a 3,100 mm (122.0 in) wheelbase and was powered by a 2234cc 4-cylinder engine, being based on one of the company's last pre-war models. Exhibited at the 15th Paris Motor Show in October 1919, the "Type S" was priced by the manufacturer at 22,500 francs, which included a "Torpedo" 4-seater body.

For 1922 Vermorel introduced a 1690cc 8/16CV model which was in some respects conservatively engineered, with a side-valve "fixed-head" engine, a foot brake that worked on the transmission and a cone clutch. The car featured four-speed transmission, and four-wheel braking was available. By the time of the 19th Paris Motor Show this model, designated as the Vermorel "Type X", was the only model represented on the manufacturer's show stand. The standard "Tourisme-ville" (towncar sedan) retained the side-valve engine but there was also a "Sport" version for which overhead valvegear was used. The wheelbases was (still) 3,100 mm (122.0 in) on the standard car, but the "Sports" model featured a reduced 2,950 mm (116.1 in) wheelbase. The manufacturer's price for a "Torpedo" bodied car was now 27,200 francs.

Victor Vermorel died in 1927 and the business passed to his son, Édouard Vermorel. François Pilain had already died, in 1924, after falling from a moving tram.

In October 1928 the 1690cc model, now designated as the Vermorel "Type ZX" was again on display on the Vermorel stand at the 22nd Paris Motor Show, its wheelbase now trimmed to 3,050 mm (120.1 in). The normal version was now labelled as the "Grand Tourisme" and, as before, a slightly more rapid "Sport" version was also offered. A top speed of 100 km/h (62 mph) was listed for the "Type ZX Sport". There was also a new model launched ahead of the 1929 model year, the Vermorel "Type AH3". This car featured a 2-litre 6-cylinder engine and the traditional (for Vermorel) 3,100 mm (122.0 in) wheelbase. The car was broadly conventional, but it was again fitted with a 4-speed transmission which at this time was still far from universal. It also featured a 12-volt coil ignition.

The year in which the Wall Street crash would trigger a deep and sustained economic depression across western economies, was, with the benefit of hindsight, not the best time to be broadening the range upmarket. The automobile business was in any event being transformed by the introduction, spearheaded in France by Citroën, of "all-steel" car bodies. For volume producers willing and able to invest in huge steel presses and dies for stamping out large numbers of identical and increasingly complex steel panels, "all-steel" car bodies carried the lure of big profits, but for second tier makers of mid-range cars there was no prospect of achieving the volumes necessary to cover the capital cost of the plant. Edouard Vermorel ended passenger car production in 1930. Truck production continued only till 1932. The company itself survived for more than a further three decades, concentrating again on the agricultural machinery sector, in respect of which it had never lost its engineering expertise.

Édouard Vermorel died in 1957 after which the company was subject to several changes in ownership before it finally closed down in 1965.

== Reading list ==
- Harald Linz, Halwart Schrader: Die Internationale Automobil-Enzyklopädie. United Soft Media Verlag, München 2008, ISBN 978-3-8032-9876-8. (German)
- George Nick Georgano (Chefredakteur): The Beaulieu Encyclopedia of the Automobile. Volume 3: P–Z. Fitzroy Dearborn Publishers, Chicago 2001, ISBN 1-57958-293-1. (English)
- George Nick Georgano: Autos. Encyclopédie complète. 1885 à nos jours. Courtille, Paris 1975. (French)
