= Saint-Didier-de-Formans =

Commune in Auvergne-Rhône-Alpes, France

- Commune
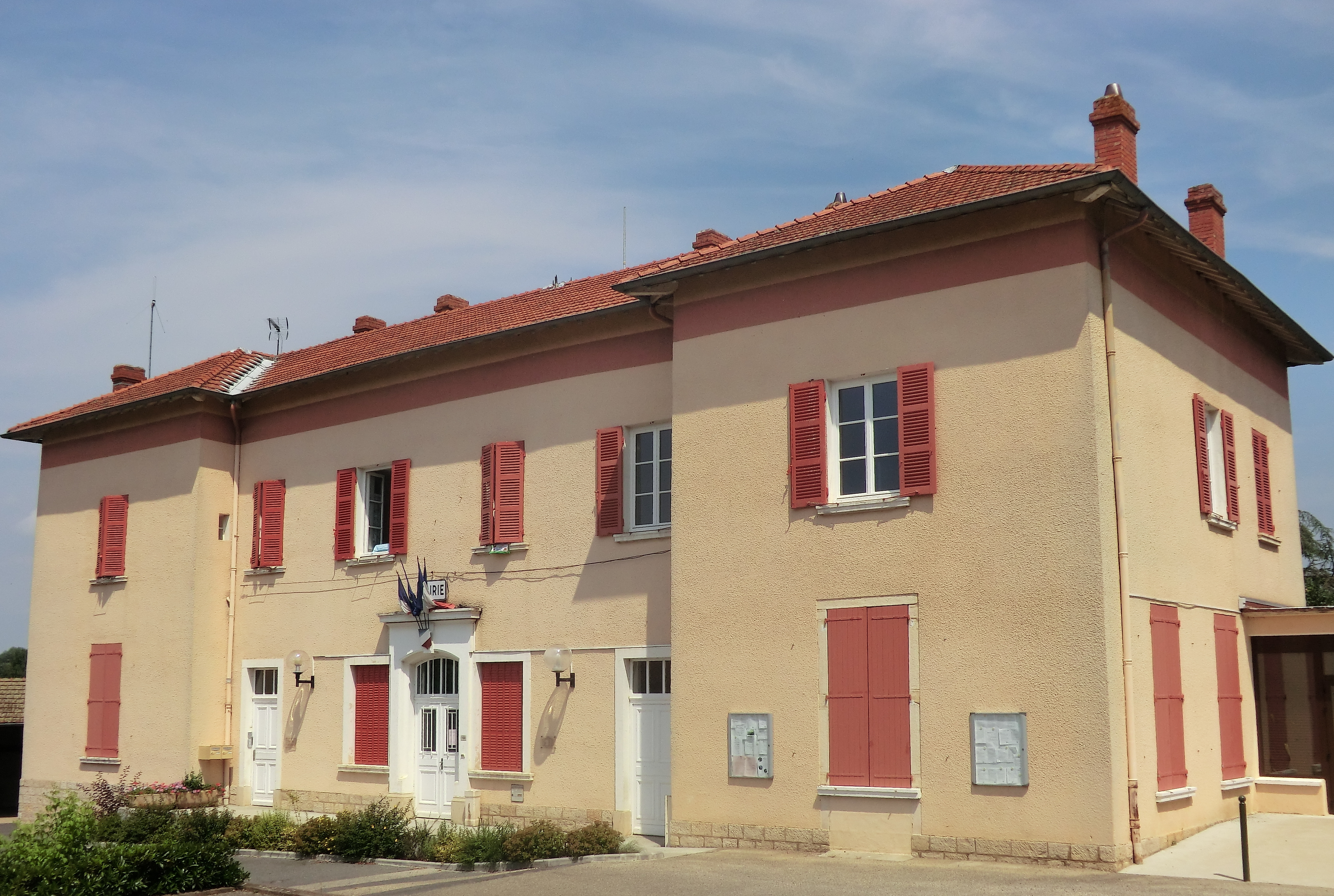
- Town hall

- Coat of arms
- Location of Saint-Didier-de-Formans
- Location within France Location within Auvergne-Rhône-Alpes
- Coordinates: 45°57′26″N 4°46′52″E
- Country: France
- Region: Auvergne-Rhône-Alpes
- Department: Ain
- Arrondissement: Bourg-en-Bresse
- Canton: Trévoux

Government
  - Mayor (2026–32): Frédéric Vallos
- Area^{1}: 6.54 km^{2} (2.53 sq mi)
- Elevation: 210 m (690 ft)
- Highest elevation: 258 m (846 ft)
- Lowest elevation: 179 m (587 ft)
- Population (2023): 2,203
  - Density: 337/km^{2} (872/sq mi)
- Time zone: UTC+01:00 (CET)
  - Summer (DST): UTC+02:00 (CEST)
- INSEE/Postal code: 01347 /01600
- ^{1} French Land Register data, which excludes lakes, ponds, glaciers > 1 km^{2} (0.386 sq mi or 247 acres) and river estuaries.

Saint-Didier-de-Formans (French pronunciation: [sɛ̃ didje də fɔʁmɑ̃], literally Saint-Didier of Formans) is a commune in the Ain department in eastern France.

== Population ==
Historical population

Year	Pop.	±% p.a.
1793	410	—
1821	507	+0.76%
1846	650	+1.00%
1872	632	−0.11%
1901	515	−0.70%
1921	519	+0.04%
1936	548	+0.36%
1946	476	−1.40%
1962	627	+1.74%

Year	Pop.	±% p.a.
1968	648	+0.55%
1975	665	+0.37%
1982	992	+5.88%
1990	1,288	+3.32%
1999	1,544	+2.03%
2007	1,777	+1.77%
2012	1,782	+0.06%
2017	1,960	+1.92%
2023	2,203	+1.97%

Source: EHESS and INSEE (1968-2023)

== Personalities ==
The historian Marc Bloch (1886-1944) was executed by the Gestapo here.

== See also ==
- Communes of the Ain department
