= François-Marie Treyve =

François-Marie Treyve (1847–1906) was a French landscape gardener.

== Life ==
Treyve originated from Trévoux. He was trained by his father-in-law, Joseph Marie. In the 1880s he was appointed Inspector of Parks and Gardens of Vichy. He took over from his father-in-law at Moulins in 1881 and set up the landscape gardening firm Établissements Treyve-Marie, in which he in turned trained his sons, Joseph and François. He transformed the old park at Vichy and created the Parc des Célestins. He was also the creator of many private parks across the Auvergne region, including those at:

- Château de Saint-Hubert at Chavenon
- Château de Pesteils at Polminhac
- Château de Montagne at Crevant-Laveine
- Château de Fougis at Thionne
- Château de la Varenne at La Varenne.

He was summoned to the Russian court in 1891, from where he received horticultural commissions until 1896. In 1894 he published "Un voyage horticole au Caucase" ("A Horticultural Journey to the Caucasus").

Treyve was inspired by and indebted to the work of the great landscape gardener of the previous generation, Paul de Lavenne, Comte de Choulot.
