= Frans, Ain =

Commune in Auvergne-Rhône-Alpes, France

Frans
- Commune
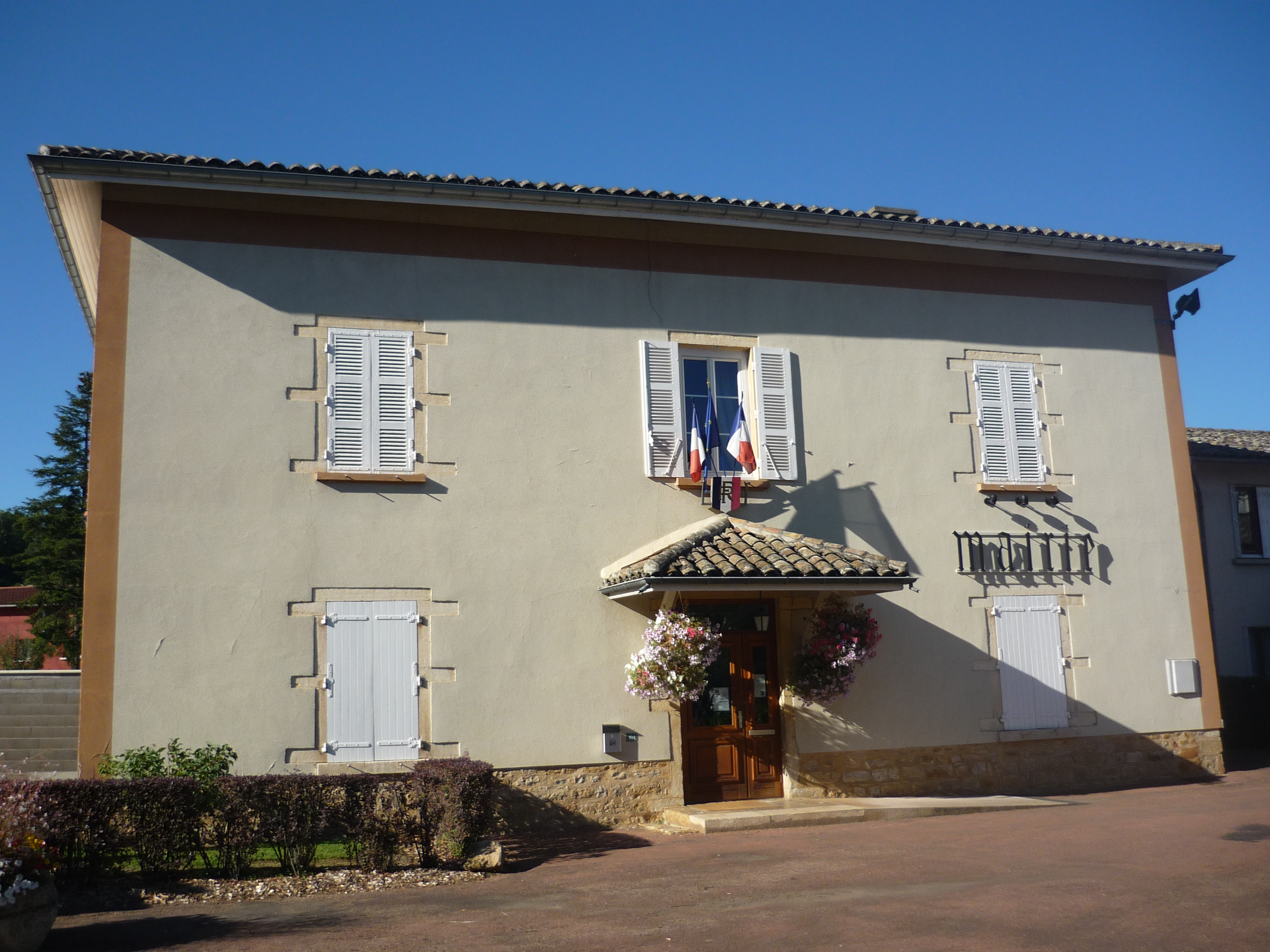
- Town hall
- Location of Frans
- Location within France Location within Auvergne-Rhône-Alpes
- Coordinates: 45°59′32″N 4°46′29″E
- Country: France
- Region: Auvergne-Rhône-Alpes
- Department: Ain
- Arrondissement: Bourg-en-Bresse
- Canton: Trévoux

Government
  - Mayor (2026–32): Guy Sanchez
- Area^{1}: 7.98 km^{2} (3.08 sq mi)
- Elevation: 200 m (660 ft)
- Highest elevation: 267 m (876 ft)
- Lowest elevation: 183 m (600 ft)
- Population (2023): 2,582
  - Density: 324/km^{2} (838/sq mi)
- Time zone: UTC+01:00 (CET)
  - Summer (DST): UTC+02:00 (CEST)
- INSEE/Postal code: 01166 /01480
- ^{1} French Land Register data, which excludes lakes, ponds, glaciers > 1 km^{2} (0.386 sq mi or 247 acres) and river estuaries.

Frans (French pronunciation: [fʁɑ̃]), known colloquially as Frans-les-Vernes, is a commune in the Ain department in eastern France.

== Géography ==
The village is located in the south-western part of the Ain department in the fertile Val de Saône some 35 km north of Lyon and 4 km east of Villefranche-sur-Saône.

== Population ==
The inhabitants of Frans are called Franvernois in French.

Historical population

Year	Pop.	±% p.a.
1793	214	—
1800	208	−0.41%
1806	281	+5.14%
1821	338	+1.24%
1831	312	−0.80%
1836	325	+0.82%
1841	339	+0.85%
1846	371	+1.82%
1851	379	+0.43%
1856	355	−1.30%
1861	380	+1.37%
1866	401	+1.08%
1872	400	−0.04%
1876	383	−1.08%
1881	373	−0.53%
1886	349	−1.32%
1891	351	+0.11%
1896	368	+0.95%
1901	372	+0.22%

Year	Pop.	±% p.a.
1906	388	+0.85%
1911	360	−1.49%
1921	347	−0.37%
1926	384	+2.05%
1931	391	+0.36%
1936	404	+0.66%
1946	416	+0.29%
1954	455	+1.13%
1962	478	+0.62%
1968	528	+1.67%
1975	752	+5.18%
1982	1,000	+4.16%
1990	1,549	+5.62%
1999	1,848	+1.98%
2007	1,972	+0.82%
2012	1,972	+0.00%
2017	2,351	+3.58%
2023	2,582	+1.57%

Source: EHESS and INSEE (1968-2023)

== See also ==
- Communes of the Ain department
