= Parcieux =

Commune in Auvergne-Rhône-Alpes, France

Parcieux Parciô (Arpitan)
- Commune
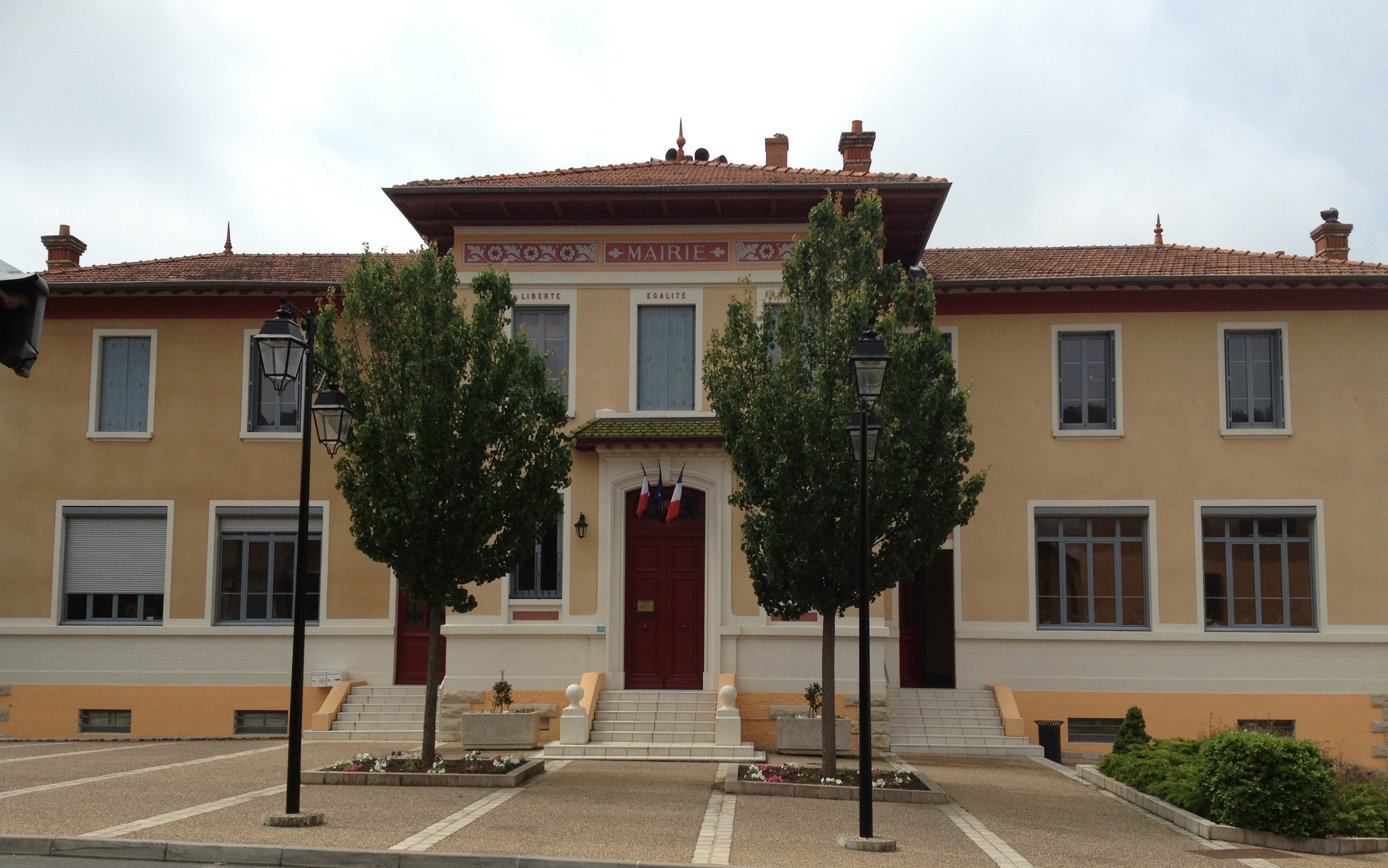
- Town hall
- Location of Parcieux
- Location within France Location within Auvergne-Rhône-Alpes
- Coordinates: 45°54′59″N 4°49′32″E
- Country: France
- Region: Auvergne-Rhône-Alpes
- Department: Ain
- Arrondissement: Bourg-en-Bresse
- Canton: Trévoux
- Intercommunality: Dombes Saône Vallée

Government
  - Mayor (2026–32): Annie Skrzypczak
- Area^{1}: 3.14 km^{2} (1.21 sq mi)
- Elevation: 102 m (335 ft)
- Highest elevation: 287 m (942 ft)
- Lowest elevation: 168 m (551 ft)
- Population (2023): 1,315
  - Density: 419/km^{2} (1,080/sq mi)
- Time zone: UTC+01:00 (CET)
  - Summer (DST): UTC+02:00 (CEST)
- INSEE/Postal code: 01285 /01600
- ^{1} French Land Register data, which excludes lakes, ponds, glaciers > 1 km^{2} (0.386 sq mi or 247 acres) and river estuaries.

Parcieux (French pronunciation: [paʁsjø]; Arpitan: Parciô [par.ˈʃy]) is a commune in Ain department, in eastern France.

== Geography ==
Parcieux is located in Dombes, a natural region on the southwest part of Ain. It lies a few kilometres north of Lyon.

== Population ==
Its inhabitants are known as Parcevins in French.

Historical population
Year	Pop.	±% p.a.
1968	438	—
1975	481	+1.35%
1982	652	+4.44%
1990	784	+2.33%
1999	909	+1.66%
2007	1,033	+1.61%
2012	1,124	+1.70%
2017	1,206	+1.42%
2023	1,315	+1.45%
Source: INSEE

== See also ==
- Communes of the Ain department
