= Massieux =

Commune in Auvergne-Rhône-Alpes, France

Massieux Massiô (Arpitan)
- Commune
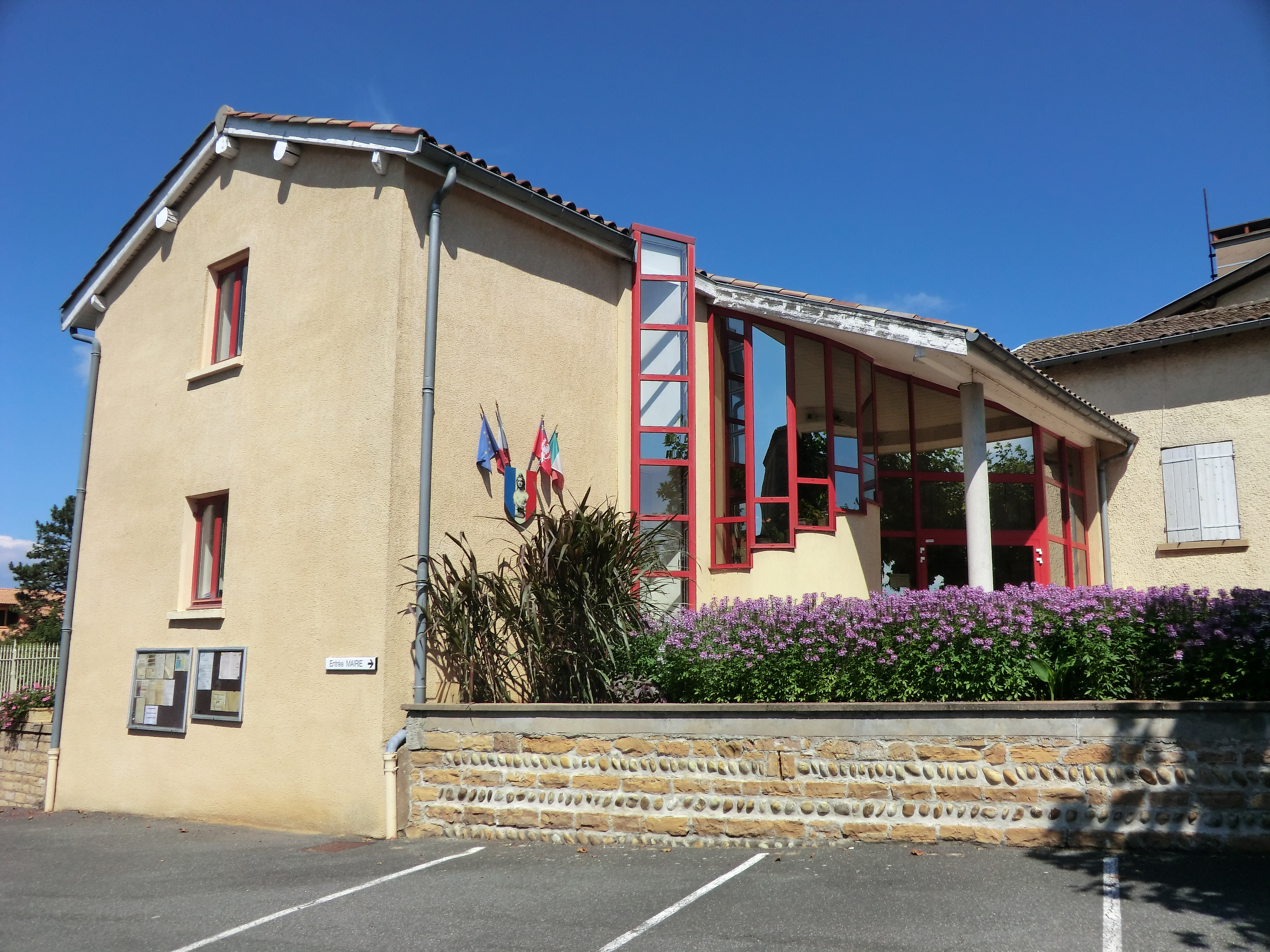
- Town hall
- Location of Massieux
- Location within France Location within Auvergne-Rhône-Alpes
- Coordinates: 45°55′00″N 4°50′00″E
- Country: France
- Region: Auvergne-Rhône-Alpes
- Department: Ain
- Arrondissement: Bourg-en-Bresse
- Canton: Trévoux

Government
  - Mayor (2026–32): Patrick Nabeth
- Area^{1}: 3 km^{2} (1.2 sq mi)
- Elevation: 483 m (1,585 ft)
- Highest elevation: 284 m (932 ft)
- Lowest elevation: 168 m (551 ft)
- Population (2023): 2,843
  - Density: 950/km^{2} (2,500/sq mi)
- Time zone: UTC+01:00 (CET)
  - Summer (DST): UTC+02:00 (CEST)
- INSEE/Postal code: 01238 /01600
- ^{1} French Land Register data, which excludes lakes, ponds, glaciers > 1 km^{2} (0.386 sq mi or 247 acres) and river estuaries.

Massieux (French pronunciation: [masjø]; Arpitan: Massiô [ma.ˈʃy]) is a commune in the Ain department in eastern France.

== Geography ==
Massieux is located in Dombes, a natural region on the southwest part of Ain. It lies a few kilometres north of Lyon.

== Population ==
Historical population

Year	Pop.	±% p.a.
1793	183	—
1831	317	+1.46%
1851	308	−0.14%
1872	299	−0.14%
1901	236	−0.81%
1926	235	−0.02%
1946	215	−0.44%
1954	266	+2.70%
1962	286	+0.91%

Year	Pop.	±% p.a.
1968	291	+0.29%
1975	805	+15.65%
1982	1,568	+9.99%
1990	1,782	+1.61%
1999	2,120	+1.95%
2007	2,367	+1.39%
2012	2,420	+0.44%
2017	2,590	+1.37%
2023	2,843	+1.57%

Source: EHESS and INSEE (1968-2023)

== See also ==
- Communes of the Ain department
