= Canton of Trévoux =

Coordinates: 45°56′28″N 4°46′30″E

Trévoux
- Canton
- Interactive map of Trévoux
- Country: France
- Region: Auvergne-Rhône-Alpes
- Department: Ain
- No. of communes: {{{nbcomm}}}
- Area: 67.82 km^{2} (26.19 sq mi)
- Population (2023): 35,045
  - Density: 516.7/km^{2} (1,338/sq mi)
- INSEE code: 01 21

The canton of Trévoux is an administrative division in eastern France. At the French canton reorganisation which came into effect in March 2015, the canton was expanded from 6 to 12 communes:

1. Beauregard
2. Frans
3. Jassans-Riottier
4. Massieux
5. Misérieux
6. Parcieux
7. Reyrieux
8. Saint-Bernard
9. Saint-Didier-de-Formans
10. Sainte-Euphémie
11. Toussieux
12. Trévoux

== Demographics ==
Historical population
| Year | Pop. | ±% p.a. |
|---|---|---|
| 2013 | 31,428 | — |
| 2018 | 33,447 | +1.25% |
Source: INSEE

== See also ==
- Cantons of the Ain department
- Communes of France
