= Misérieux =

Commune in Auvergne-Rhône-Alpes, France

Misérieux Mesèriô (Arpitan)
- Commune
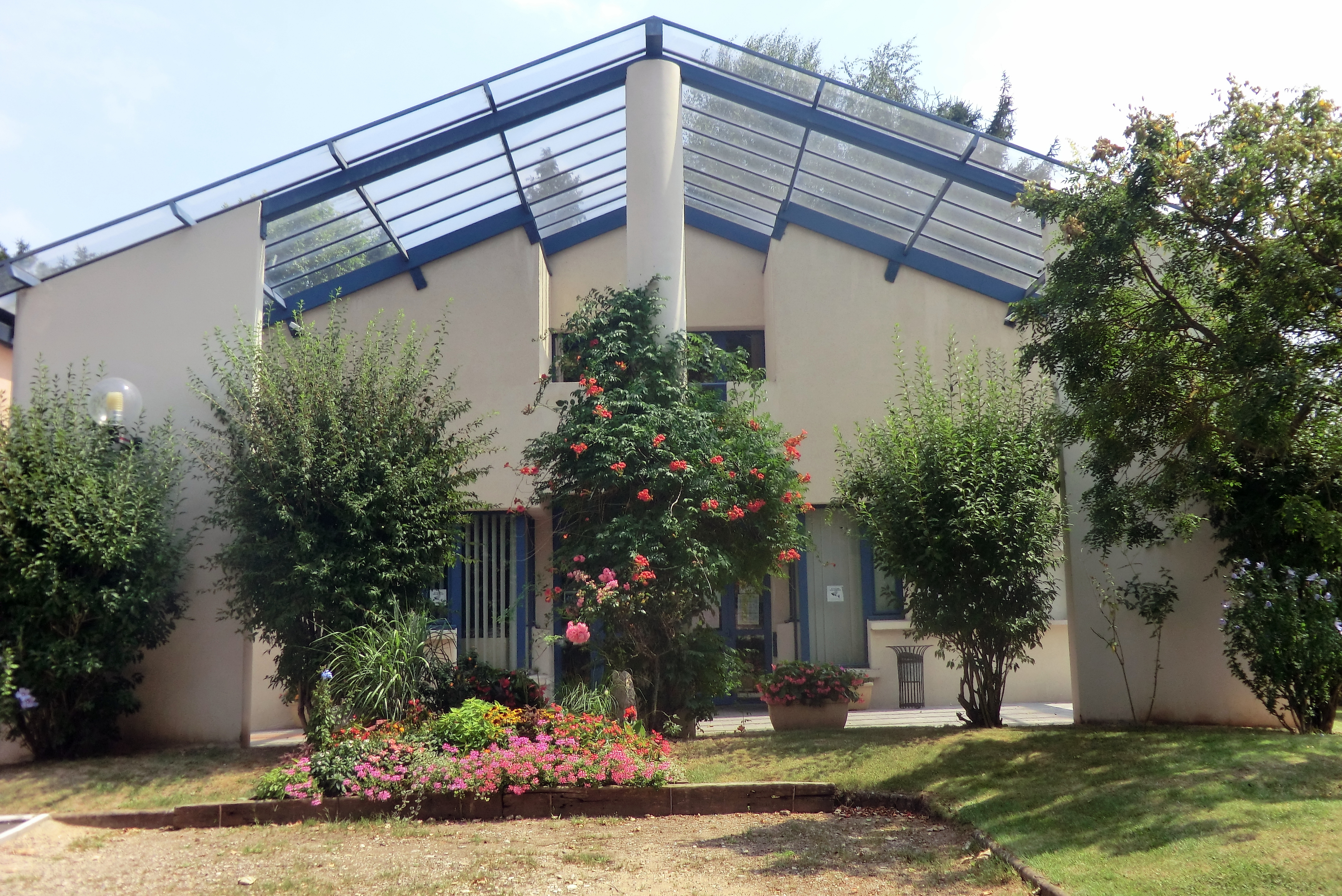
- Town hall
- Location of Misérieux
- Location within France Location within Auvergne-Rhône-Alpes
- Coordinates: 45°58′27″N 4°48′41″E
- Country: France
- Region: Auvergne-Rhône-Alpes
- Department: Ain
- Arrondissement: Bourg-en-Bresse
- Canton: Trévoux

Government
  - Mayor (2026–32): Gabriel Aumonier
- Area^{1}: 7.41 km^{2} (2.86 sq mi)
- Elevation: 226 m (741 ft)
- Highest elevation: 280 m (920 ft)
- Lowest elevation: 211 m (692 ft)
- Population (2023): 2,008
  - Density: 271/km^{2} (702/sq mi)
- Time zone: UTC+01:00 (CET)
  - Summer (DST): UTC+02:00 (CEST)
- INSEE/Postal code: 01250 /01600
- ^{1} French Land Register data, which excludes lakes, ponds, glaciers > 1 km^{2} (0.386 sq mi or 247 acres) and river estuaries.

Misérieux (French pronunciation: [mizeʁjø]; Arpitan: Mesèriô [mze.ˈðy]) is a commune in the Ain department in eastern France.

== Population ==
Historical population
Year	Pop.	±% p.a.
1968	575	—
1975	686	+2.55%
1982	868	+3.42%
1990	1,224	+4.39%
1999	1,430	+1.74%
2007	1,700	+2.19%
2012	1,785	+0.98%
2017	1,941	+1.69%
2023	2,008	+0.57%
Source: INSEE

== See also ==
- Communes of the Ain department
