= Jassans-Riottier =

Commune in Auvergne-Rhône-Alpes, France

- Commune
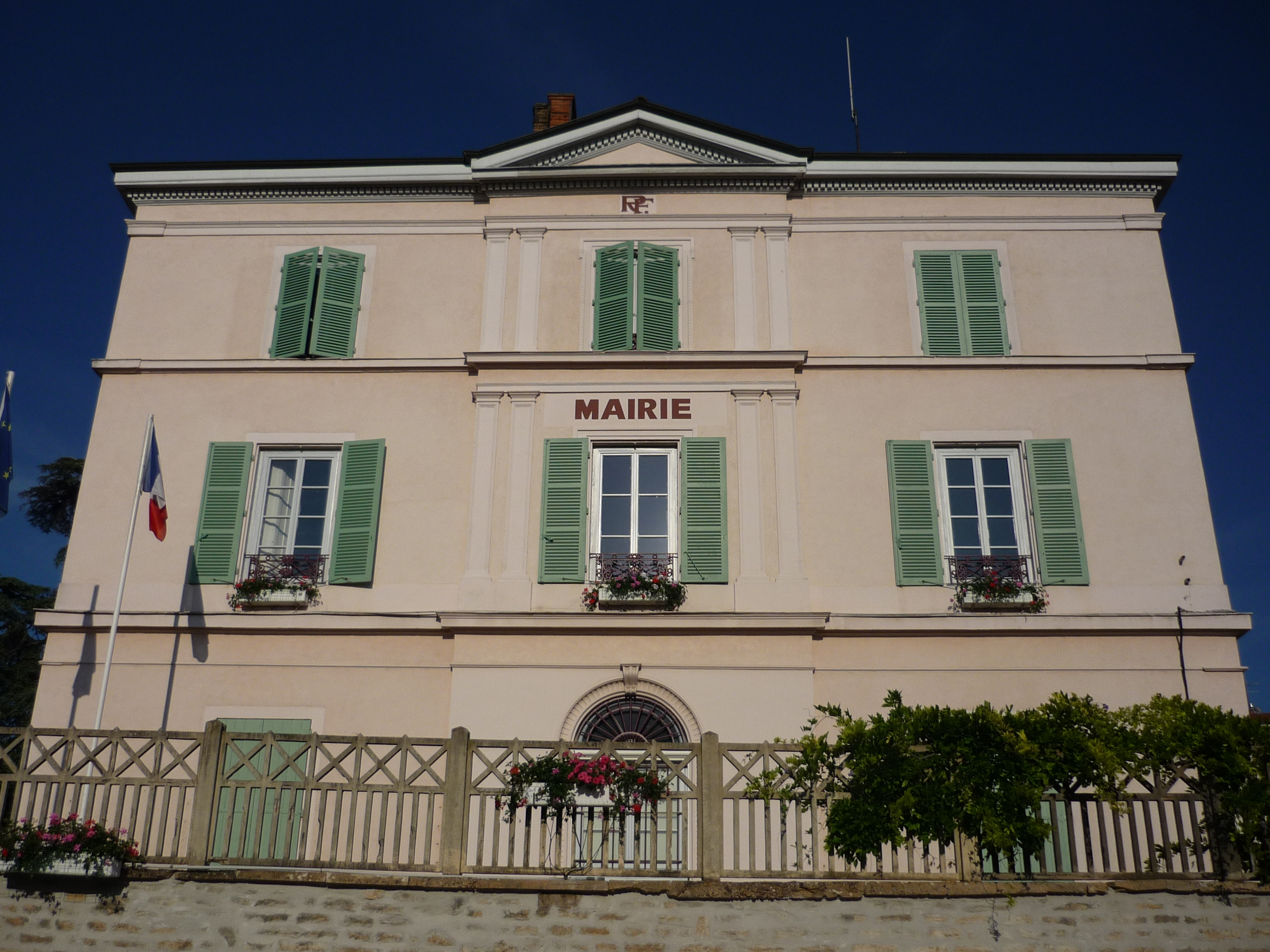
- Town hall

- Coat of arms
- Location of Jassans-Riottier
- Location within France Location within Auvergne-Rhône-Alpes
- Coordinates: 45°59′10″N 4°45′27″E
- Country: France
- Region: Auvergne-Rhône-Alpes
- Department: Ain
- Arrondissement: Bourg-en-Bresse
- Canton: Trévoux
- Intercommunality: CA Villefranche Beaujolais Saône

Government
  - Mayor (2026–32): Marie-Laure Reix
- Area^{1}: 4.81 km^{2} (1.86 sq mi)
- Elevation: 175 m (574 ft)
- Highest elevation: 249 m (817 ft)
- Lowest elevation: 167 m (548 ft)
- Population (2023): 6,247
  - Density: 1,300/km^{2} (3,360/sq mi)
- Time zone: UTC+01:00 (CET)
  - Summer (DST): UTC+02:00 (CEST)
- INSEE/Postal code: 01194 /01480
- ^{1} French Land Register data, which excludes lakes, ponds, glaciers > 1 km^{2} (0.386 sq mi or 247 acres) and river estuaries.

Jassans-Riottier (French pronunciation: [ʒasɑ̃ ʁjɔtje]), known colloquially as Jassans, is a commune in the Ain department in eastern France.

== Géography ==
Jassans is located in the south-western part of the Ain department in the fertile Val de Saône some 35 km north of Lyon and 2 km east of Villefranche-sur-Saône.

== Population ==
Historical population
Year	Pop.	±% p.a.
1968	2,190	—
1975	2,783	+3.48%
1982	3,830	+4.67%
1990	4,609	+2.34%
1999	5,338	+1.64%
2007	5,903	+1.27%
2012	6,306	+1.33%
2017	6,339	+0.10%
2023	6,247	−0.24%
Source: INSEE

== See also ==
- Communes of the Ain department
