= Reyrieux =

Commune in Auvergne-Rhône-Alpes, France

- Commune
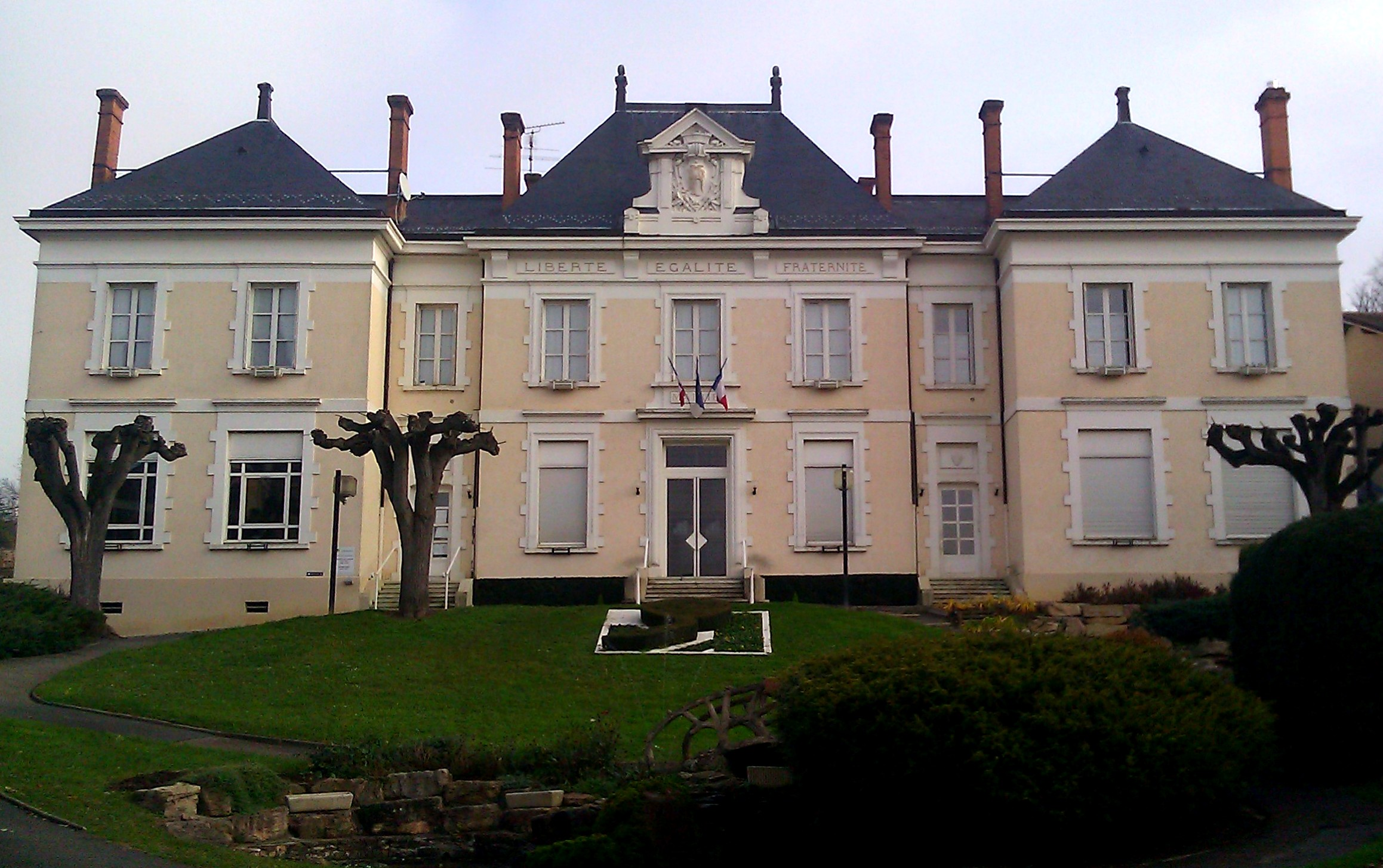
- Town hall
- Location of Reyrieux
- Location within France Location within Auvergne-Rhône-Alpes
- Coordinates: 45°56′00″N 4°49′00″E
- Country: France
- Region: Auvergne-Rhône-Alpes
- Department: Ain
- Arrondissement: Bourg-en-Bresse
- Canton: Trévoux

Government
  - Mayor (2026–32): Cécile Baudoux
- Area^{1}: 15.69 km^{2} (6.06 sq mi)
- Elevation: 198 m (650 ft)
- Highest elevation: 297 m (974 ft)
- Lowest elevation: 163 m (535 ft)
- Population (2023): 5,358
  - Density: 341.5/km^{2} (884.5/sq mi)
- Time zone: UTC+01:00 (CET)
  - Summer (DST): UTC+02:00 (CEST)
- INSEE/Postal code: 01322 /01600
- ^{1} French Land Register data, which excludes lakes, ponds, glaciers > 1 km^{2} (0.386 sq mi or 247 acres) and river estuaries.

Reyrieux (French pronunciation: [ʁɛʁjø]) is a commune in the Ain department in eastern France.

== Population ==
Historical population

Year	Pop.	±% p.a.
1793	1,043	—
1800	723	−5.10%
1806	488	−6.34%
1821	1,135	+5.79%
1831	1,480	+2.69%
1836	1,410	−0.96%
1841	1,515	+1.45%
1846	1,557	+0.55%
1851	1,705	+1.83%
1856	1,614	−1.09%
1861	1,529	−1.08%
1866	1,514	−0.20%
1872	1,488	−0.29%
1876	1,491	+0.05%
1881	1,428	−0.86%
1886	1,437	+0.13%
1891	1,470	+0.46%
1896	1,400	−0.97%
1901	1,127	−4.25%

Year	Pop.	±% p.a.
1906	1,118	−0.16%
1911	1,089	−0.52%
1921	1,005	−0.80%
1926	1,012	+0.14%
1931	1,088	+1.46%
1936	1,103	+0.27%
1946	1,074	−0.27%
1954	1,099	+0.29%
1962	1,162	+0.70%
1968	1,262	+1.39%
1975	1,536	+2.85%
1982	2,380	+6.46%
1990	3,057	+3.18%
1999	3,683	+2.09%
2007	3,992	+1.01%
2012	4,311	+1.55%
2017	4,797	+2.16%
2023	5,358	+1.86%

Source: EHESS and INSEE (1968-2023)

== See also ==
- Communes of the Ain department
