= Toussieux =

Commune in Auvergne-Rhône-Alpes, France

- Commune
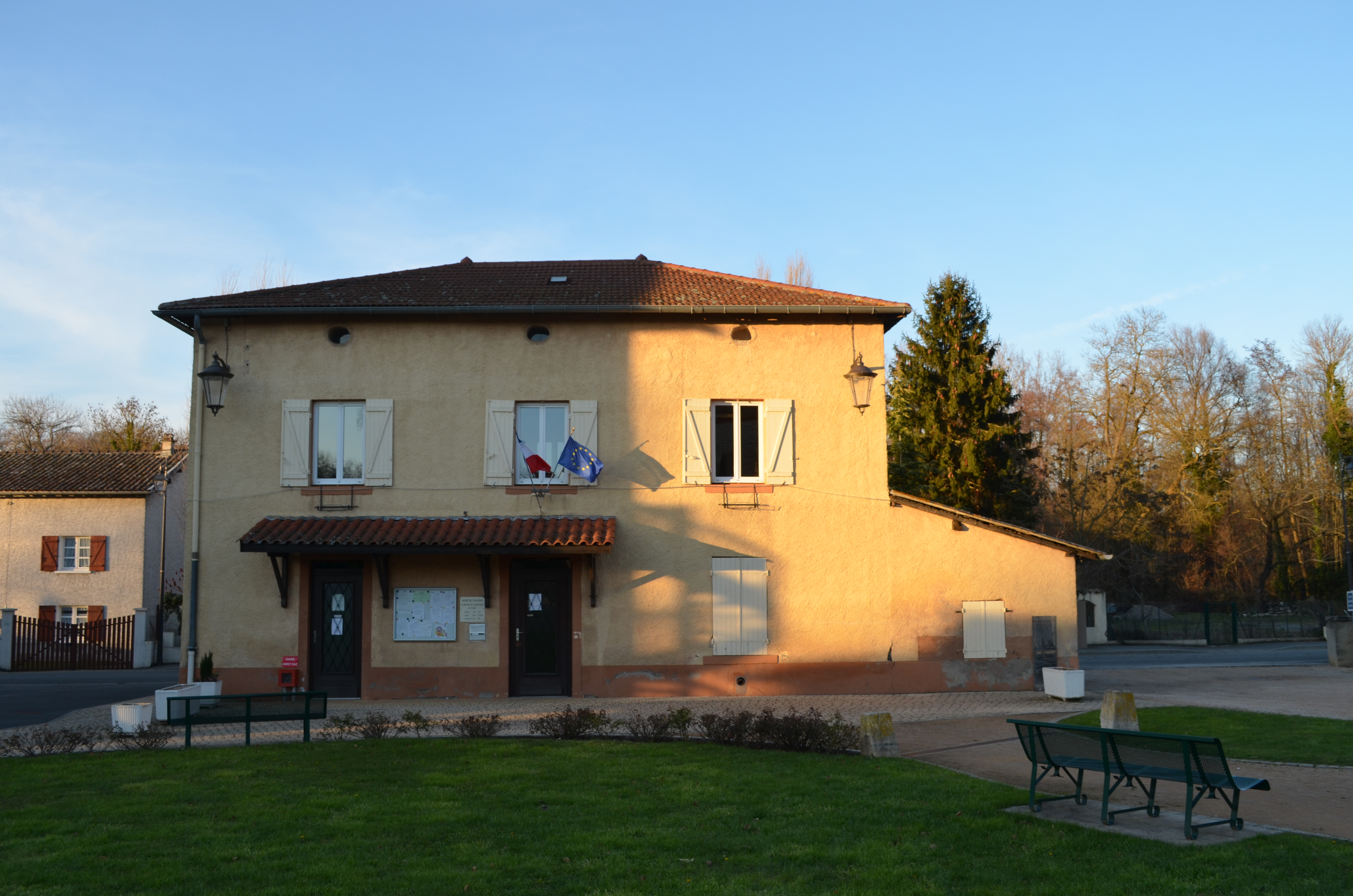
- Town hall
- Location of Toussieux
- Location within France Location within Auvergne-Rhône-Alpes
- Coordinates: 45°57′41″N 4°49′46″E
- Country: France
- Region: Auvergne-Rhône-Alpes
- Department: Ain
- Arrondissement: Bourg-en-Bresse
- Canton: Trévoux

Government
  - Mayor (2026–32): Armand Chaumont
- Area^{1}: 4.74 km^{2} (1.83 sq mi)
- Elevation: 260 m (850 ft)
- Highest elevation: 281 m (922 ft)
- Lowest elevation: 220 m (720 ft)
- Population (2023): 1,257
  - Density: 265/km^{2} (687/sq mi)
- Time zone: UTC+01:00 (CET)
  - Summer (DST): UTC+02:00 (CEST)
- INSEE/Postal code: 01423 /01600
- ^{1} French Land Register data, which excludes lakes, ponds, glaciers > 1 km^{2} (0.386 sq mi or 247 acres) and river estuaries.

Toussieux (French pronunciation: [tusjø]) is a commune in the Ain department in eastern France.

== Population ==
Historical population
Year	Pop.	±% p.a.
1968	160	—
1975	156	−0.36%
1982	327	+11.15%
1990	437	+3.69%
1999	727	+5.82%
2007	737	+0.17%
2012	797	+1.58%
2017	1,091	+6.48%
2023	1,257	+2.39%
Source: INSEE

== See also ==
- Communes of the Ain department
