= Beauregard, Ain =

Commune in Auvergne-Rhône-Alpes, France

Beauregard
- Commune
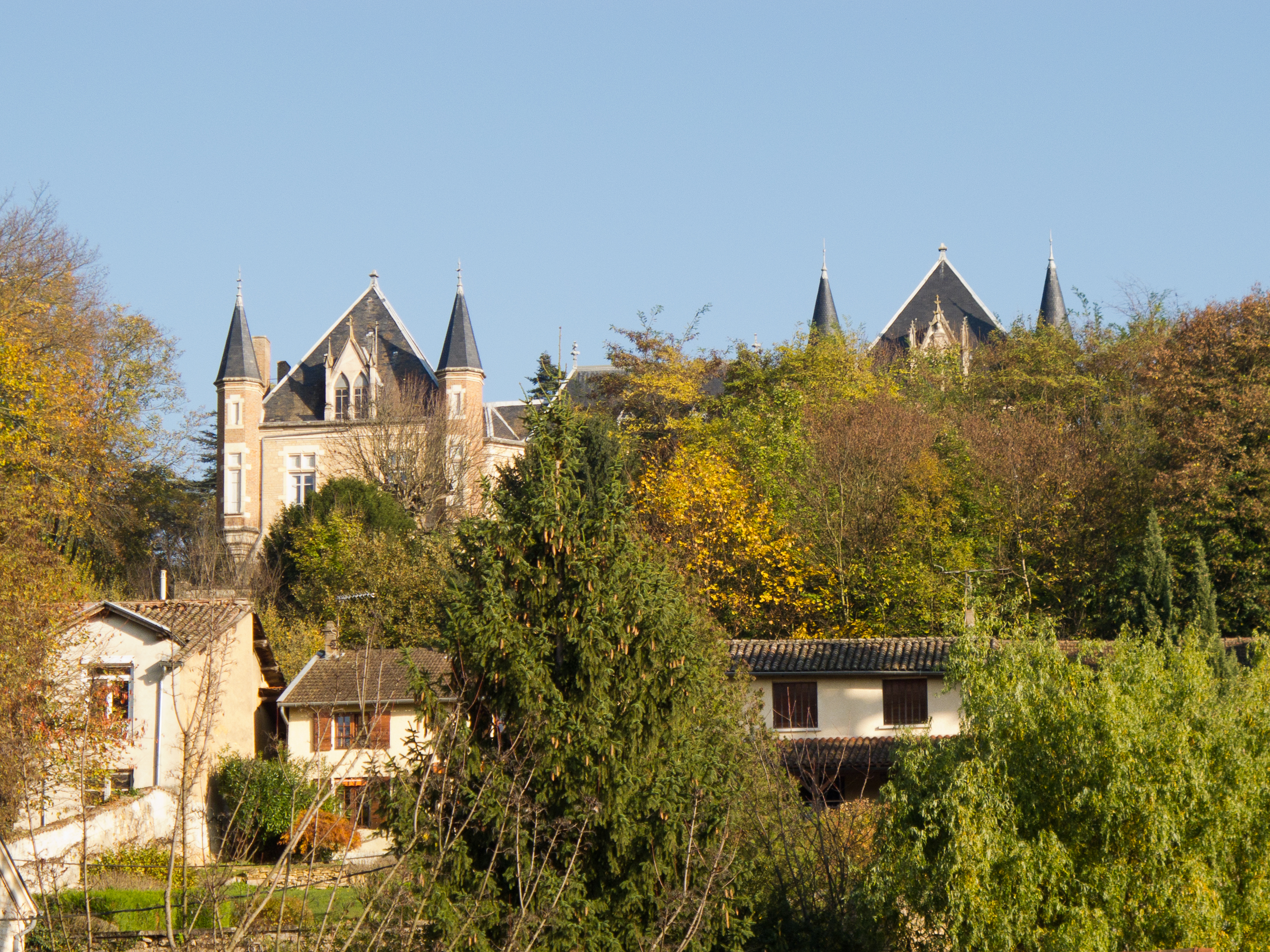
- Chateau
- Location of Beauregard
- Location within France Location within Auvergne-Rhône-Alpes
- Coordinates: 46°00′10″N 4°45′07″E
- Country: France
- Region: Auvergne-Rhône-Alpes
- Department: Ain
- Arrondissement: Bourg-en-Bresse
- Canton: Trévoux
- Intercommunality: Dombes-Saône Vallée

Government
  - Mayor (2026–32): Nadia Guyon
- Area^{1}: 0.94 km^{2} (0.36 sq mi)
- Elevation: 180 m (590 ft)
- Highest elevation: 240 m (790 ft)
- Lowest elevation: 168 m (551 ft)
- Population (2023): 872
  - Density: 930/km^{2} (2,400/sq mi)
- Time zone: UTC+01:00 (CET)
  - Summer (DST): UTC+02:00 (CEST)
- INSEE/Postal code: 01030 /01480
- Website: https://www.mairie-beauregard.fr/fr/
- ^{1} French Land Register data, which excludes lakes, ponds, glaciers > 1 km^{2} (0.386 sq mi or 247 acres) and river estuaries.

Beauregard (French pronunciation: [boʁɡaʁ]; Arpitan: Biôregouârd) is a commune in the Ain department in eastern France.

== Géography ==
Beauregard is located in the south-western part of the Ain department in the fertile Val de Saône some 35 km north of Lyon and 2 km east of Villefranche-sur-Saône.

== History ==
Beauregard takes its name from the castle built in 1290 by Gui de Chabeu on a hill overlooking the Saône and the hills of Beaujolais. The castle fell into ruin in about 1735. Restoration began in the 19th century and continues today.

A fire destroyed much of the village, and few old dwellings remain.

On 31 December 1954, Fareins-les-Beauregard was taken from Fareins and attached to Beauregard.

== Population ==
Historical population
Year	Pop.	±% p.a.
1968	584	—
1975	531	−1.35%
1982	666	+3.29%
1990	868	+3.37%
1999	817	−0.67%
2007	894	+1.13%
2012	866	−0.63%
2017	866	+0.00%
2023	872	+0.12%
Source: INSEE

== See also ==
- Communes of the Ain department
