= Sainte-Euphémie =

Commune in Auvergne-Rhône-Alpes, France

- Commune
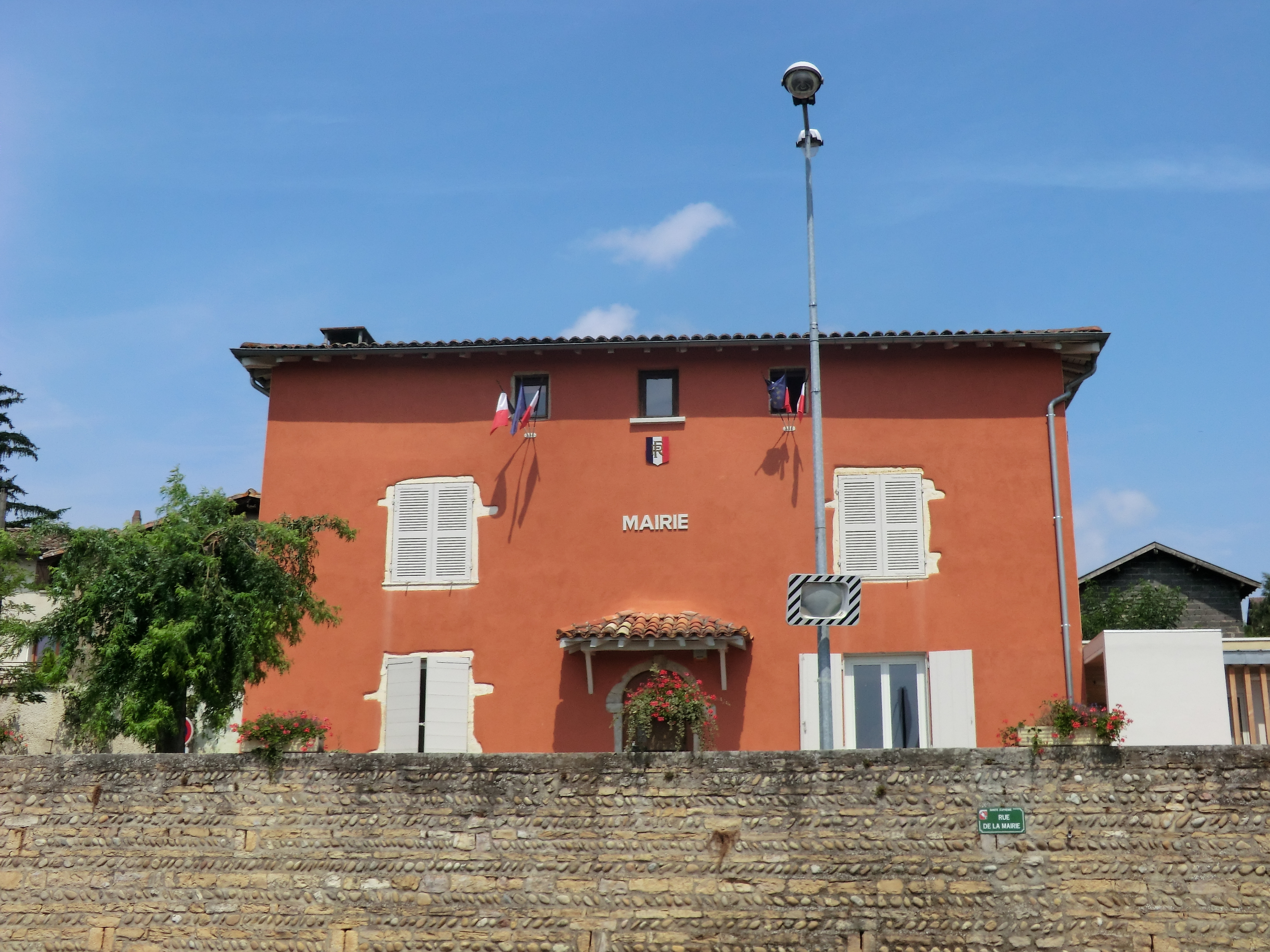
- Town hall

- Coat of arms
- Location of Sainte-Euphémie
- Location within France Location within Auvergne-Rhône-Alpes
- Coordinates: 45°58′23″N 4°47′47″E
- Country: France
- Region: Auvergne-Rhône-Alpes
- Department: Ain
- Arrondissement: Bourg-en-Bresse
- Canton: Trévoux

Government
  - Mayor (2026–32): Emmanuel Geniquet
- Area^{1}: 4.60 km^{2} (1.78 sq mi)
- Highest elevation: 258 m (846 ft)
- Lowest elevation: 195 m (640 ft)
- Population (2023): 1,757
  - Density: 382/km^{2} (989/sq mi)
- Time zone: UTC+01:00 (CET)
  - Summer (DST): UTC+02:00 (CEST)
- INSEE/Postal code: 01353 /01600
- ^{1} French Land Register data, which excludes lakes, ponds, glaciers > 1 km^{2} (0.386 sq mi or 247 acres) and river estuaries.

Sainte-Euphémie (French pronunciation: [sɛ̃t øfemi]) is a commune in the Ain department in eastern France.

== Population ==
Historical population
Year	Pop.	±% p.a.
1968	390	—
1975	472	+2.76%
1982	727	+6.37%
1990	857	+2.08%
1999	1,118	+3.00%
2007	1,362	+2.50%
2012	1,580	+3.01%
2017	1,667	+1.08%
2023	1,757	+0.88%
Source: INSEE

== See also ==
- Communes of the Ain department
