= Rancé =

Commune in Ain, France

- Commune
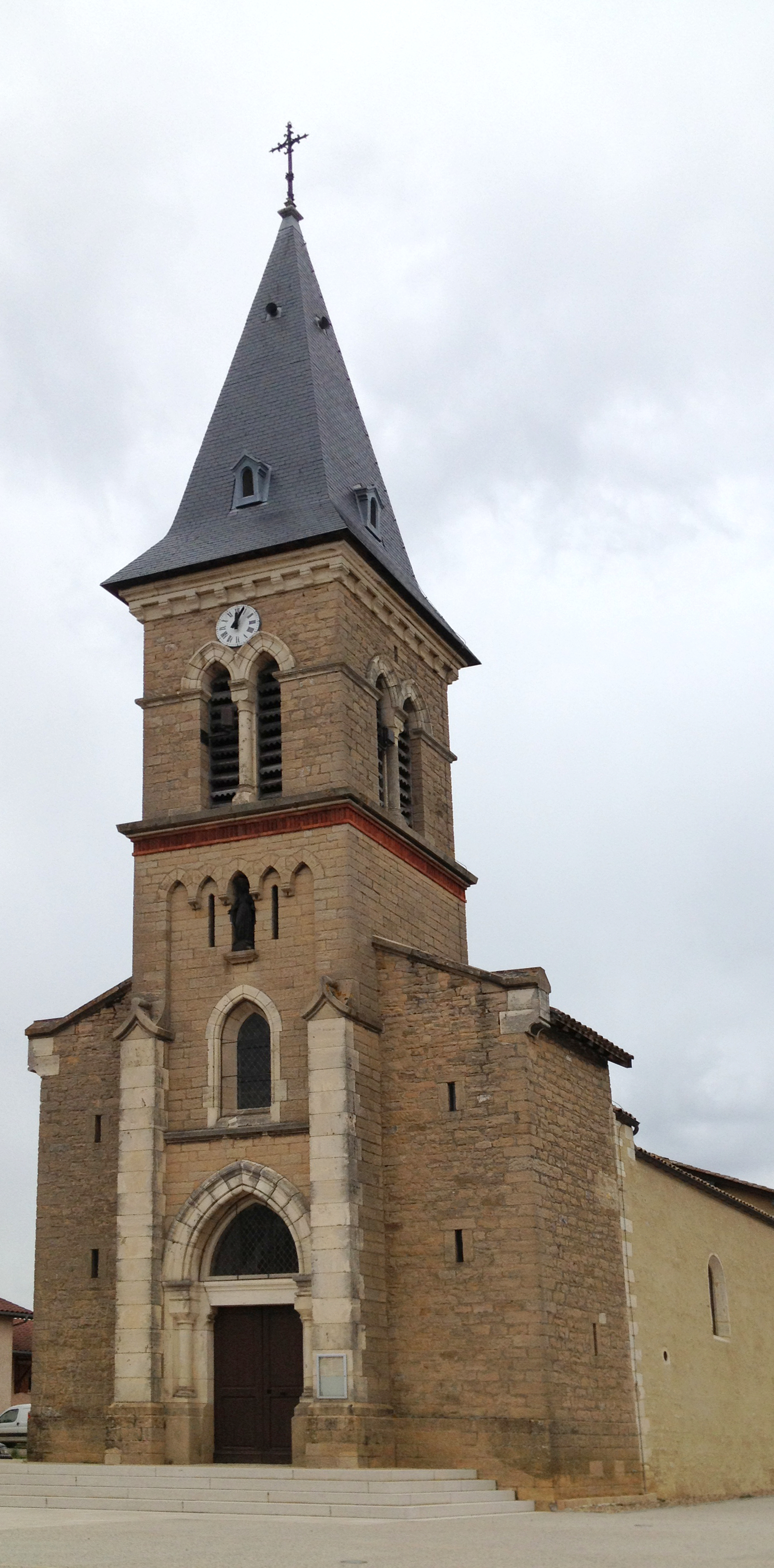
- Location of Rancé
- Location within France Location within Auvergne-Rhône-Alpes
- Coordinates: 45°57′59″N 4°52′10″E
- Country: France
- Region: Auvergne-Rhône-Alpes
- Department: Ain
- Arrondissement: Bourg-en-Bresse
- Canton: Villars-les-Dombes

Government
  - Mayor (2026–32): Fabien Bihler
- Area^{1}: 9.53 km^{2} (3.68 sq mi)
- Elevation: 300 m (980 ft)
- Highest elevation: 294 m (965 ft)
- Lowest elevation: 244 m (801 ft)
- Population (2023): 775
  - Density: 81.3/km^{2} (211/sq mi)
- Time zone: UTC+01:00 (CET)
  - Summer (DST): UTC+02:00 (CEST)
- INSEE/Postal code: 01318 /01390
- ^{1} French Land Register data, which excludes lakes, ponds, glaciers > 1 km^{2} (0.386 sq mi or 247 acres) and river estuaries.

Rancé (French pronunciation: [ʁɑ̃se]) is a commune in the Ain department in eastern France. It is about 20 km north of Lyon.

== Population ==
Historical population
Year	Pop.	±% p.a.
1968	190	—
1975	204	+1.02%
1982	323	+6.79%
1990	410	+3.03%
1999	498	+2.18%
2007	641	+3.21%
2012	667	+0.80%
2017	727	+1.74%
2023	775	+1.07%
Source: INSEE

== See also ==
- Communes of the Ain department
