= Saint-Bernard, Ain =

Commune in Auvergne-Rhône-Alpes, France

Saint-Bernard
- Commune
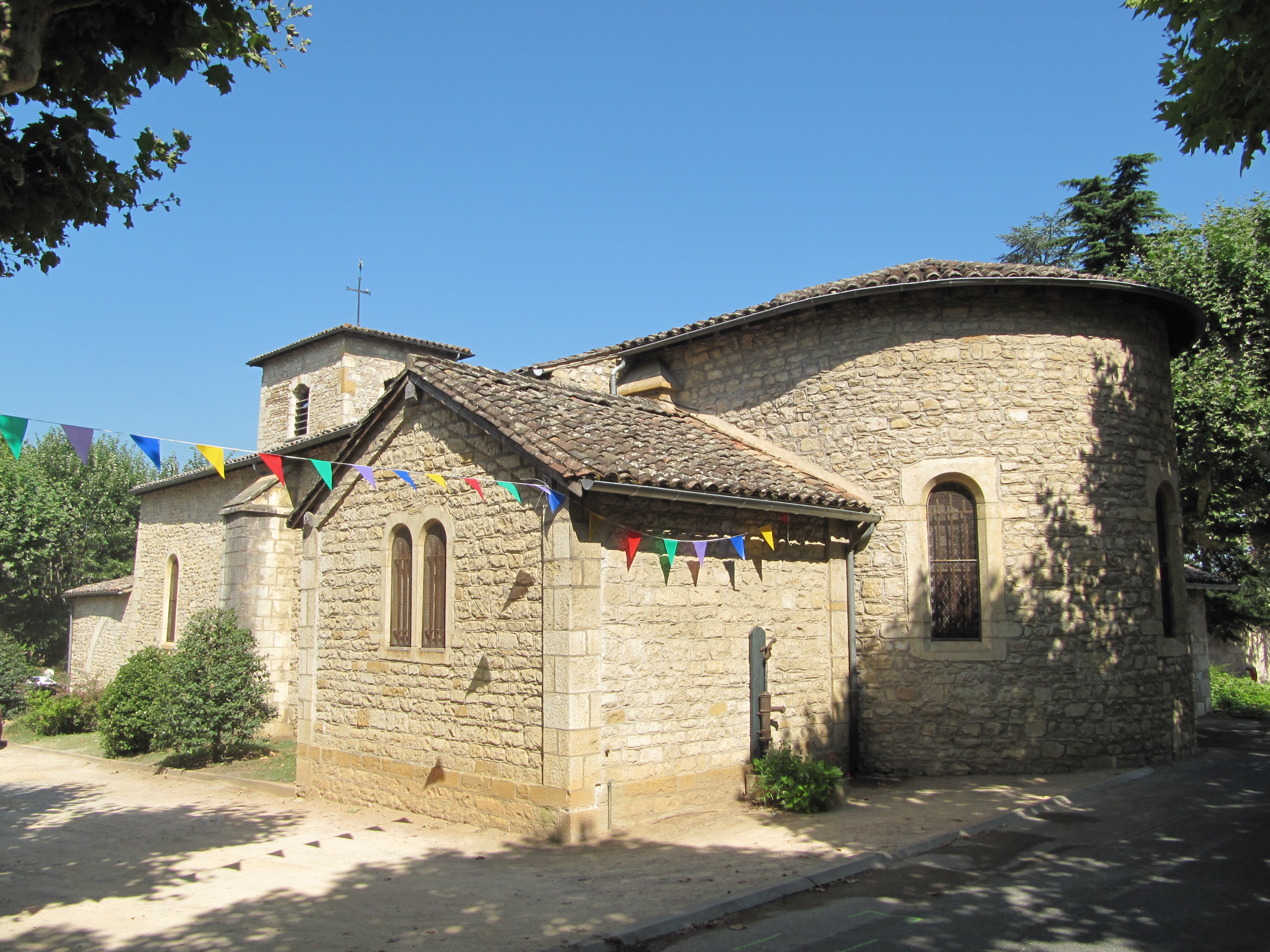
- Location of Saint-Bernard
- Location within France Location within Auvergne-Rhône-Alpes
- Coordinates: 45°56′44″N 4°43′55″E
- Country: France
- Region: Auvergne-Rhône-Alpes
- Department: Ain
- Arrondissement: Bourg-en-Bresse
- Canton: Trévoux

Government
  - Mayor (2026–32): Bélinda Teracol
- Area^{1}: 3.15 km^{2} (1.22 sq mi)
- Highest elevation: 198 m (650 ft)
- Lowest elevation: 167 m (548 ft)
- Population (2023): 1,590
  - Density: 505/km^{2} (1,310/sq mi)
- Time zone: UTC+01:00 (CET)
  - Summer (DST): UTC+02:00 (CEST)
- INSEE/Postal code: 01339 /01600
- ^{1} French Land Register data, which excludes lakes, ponds, glaciers > 1 km^{2} (0.386 sq mi or 247 acres) and river estuaries.

Saint-Bernard (French pronunciation: [sɛ̃ bɛʁnaʁ]) is a commune in the Ain department in eastern France.

It is located on the banks of the river Saône approximately 20 km north of Lyon. It has a small castle which overlooks the river and the village church.

== Population ==
Historical population
Year	Pop.	±% p.a.
1968	362	—
1975	488	+4.36%
1982	705	+5.40%
1990	872	+2.69%
1999	1,282	+4.38%
2007	1,369	+0.82%
2012	1,396	+0.39%
2017	1,433	+0.52%
2023	1,590	+1.75%
Source: INSEE

== Personalities ==
The artist Maurice Utrillo is reported to have lived in the castle and completed a number of his works there.

== See also ==
- Communes of the Ain department
