= Trévoux =

Commune in Auvergne-Rhône-Alpes, France

Trévoux Trevôrs (Arpitan)
- Commune
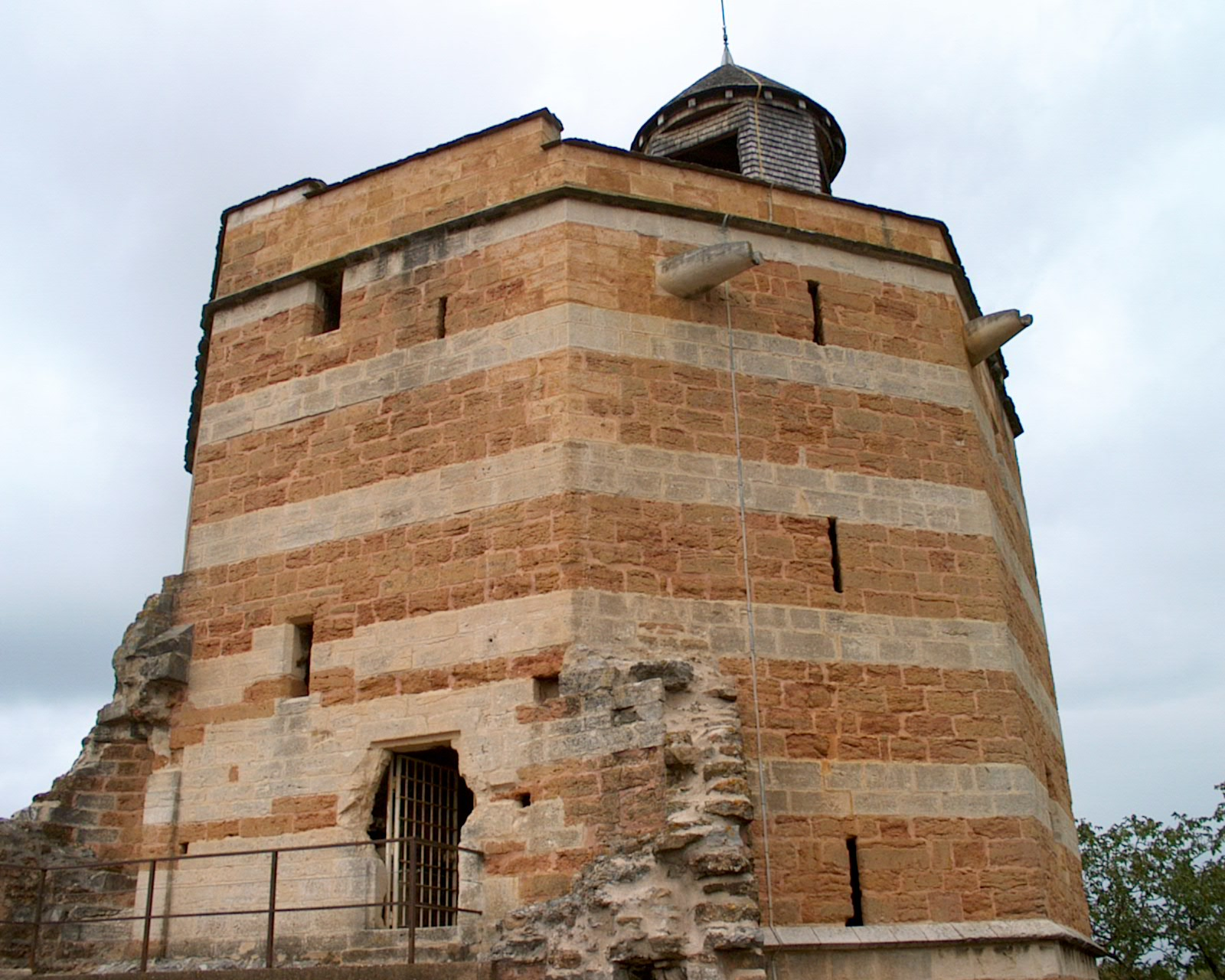
- Octagonal tower of the chateau

- Coat of arms
- Location of Trévoux
- Location within France Location within Auvergne-Rhône-Alpes
- Coordinates: 45°56′28″N 4°46′30″E
- Country: France
- Region: Auvergne-Rhône-Alpes
- Department: Ain
- Arrondissement: Bourg-en-Bresse
- Canton: Trévoux
- Intercommunality: Dombes Saône Vallée

Government
  - Mayor (2026–32): Nathanaël Duffit Ménard
- Area^{1}: 5.71 km^{2} (2.20 sq mi)
- Elevation: 177 m (581 ft)
- Highest elevation: 256 m (840 ft)
- Lowest elevation: 167 m (548 ft)
- Population (2023): 7,013
  - Density: 1,230/km^{2} (3,180/sq mi)
- Time zone: UTC+01:00 (CET)
  - Summer (DST): UTC+02:00 (CEST)
- INSEE/Postal code: 01427 /01600
- ^{1} French Land Register data, which excludes lakes, ponds, glaciers > 1 km^{2} (0.386 sq mi or 247 acres) and river estuaries.

Trévoux (French pronunciation: [tʁevu]; Arpitan: Trevôrs [trə.ˈvy]) is a commune in the Ain department in eastern France. The inhabitants are known as Trévoltiens.

It is a popular destination outside of Lyon, built on the steeply sloping left bank of the river Saône and is known for its fort.

== History ==
In AD 843, the treaty of Verdun divided up the empire of Charlemagne. The river Saône became the frontier between France and the Empire. It is thanks to this border location that Trévoux gained its particular political status.

In the 11th century it was included in the domain of the lords of Thoire-Villars, from whom it acquired its freedom. It was bought by the Bourbons in 1402, became the capital of the Dombes, and had its own mint. From that time, the Trévoux river toll became important, and the town built a castle and walls.

On the 30th of June 1417, the local baron issued a decree allowing the local Jewish population to continue to study the Talmud, contrary to the decision taken in Chambéry in January 1417 as a result of which Jewish books had been seized and burned.

In 1523, the French king François the 1st confiscated the Dombes region and founded a parliament for the region in Lyon. In 1560, the Dombes region fell to the Bourbons. The town then became rich as the capital of Dombes principality and seat of its parliament from 1697 to 1771. In 1603 a printing works was established there, from which in the 18th century the Journal de Trévouse and a universal dictionary known as the Dictionnaire de Trévoux was printed there from 1704 to 1771 by the Jesuits.

At the end of the 17th century, two important sovereign princes, Anne-Marie Louise of Orléans, Duchess of Montpensier known as "la Grande Mademoiselle", and her successor Louis-Auguste of Bourbon, duke of Maine, raised two monuments which are still notable in the landscape: the Montpensier hospital and the Palace of the Dombes Parliament.

In 1762, the principality of the Dombes was definitively absorbed into France.

The town was a sub-prefecture of Ain until 1926.

From the end of the 19th century until the 1950s, Trévoux was the global capital of the manufacture of synthetic diamonds.

== Population ==
Historical population

Year	Pop.	±% p.a.
1793	2,656	—
1800	2,530	−0.69%
1806	2,717	+1.20%
1821	3,016	+0.70%
1831	2,556	−1.64%
1836	2,559	+0.02%
1841	2,684	+0.96%
1846	2,532	−1.16%
1851	3,071	+3.94%
1856	2,749	−2.19%
1861	2,794	+0.33%
1866	2,863	+0.49%
1872	2,655	−1.25%
1876	2,889	+2.13%
1881	2,698	−1.36%
1886	2,661	−0.28%
1891	2,687	+0.19%
1896	2,662	−0.19%
1901	2,821	+1.17%

Year	Pop.	±% p.a.
1906	2,624	−1.44%
1911	3,072	+3.20%
1921	2,941	−0.43%
1926	3,122	+1.20%
1931	3,093	−0.19%
1936	3,004	−0.58%
1946	2,961	−0.14%
1954	3,229	+1.09%
1962	3,594	+1.35%
1968	4,231	+2.76%
1975	4,583	+1.15%
1982	4,982	+1.20%
1990	6,092	+2.55%
1999	6,392	+0.54%
2007	6,790	+0.76%
2012	6,714	−0.22%
2017	6,845	+0.39%
2023	7,013	+0.40%

Source: EHESS and INSEE (1968-2023)

== Personalities ==
Trévoux was the birthplace of

- François-Marie Treyve (1847–1906), writer and landscape gardener. He designed the park of the Célestins in Vichy and formed in 1881 the Établissements Treyve-Marie.
- Arthur Giry (1848–1899), historian
- Daniel Dagallier (1926–2025), fencer

== See also ==
- Communes of the Ain department
