= Canton of Lhuis =

Coordinates: 45°44′53″N 5°32′04″E

Lhuis
- Former canton
- Interactive map of Lhuis
- Country: France
- Region: Auvergne-Rhône-Alpes
- Department: Ain
- No. of communes: {{{nbcomm}}}
- Disbanded: 2015
- Area: 158.93 km^{2} (61.36 sq mi)
- Population (2012): 5,769
  - Density: 36.30/km^{2} (94.01/sq mi)

The canton of Lhuis is a former administrative division in eastern France. It was disbanded following the French canton reorganisation which came into effect in March 2015. It had 5,769 inhabitants (2012).

The canton comprised 12 communes:

- Bénonces
- Briord
- Groslée
- Innimond
- Lhuis
- Lompnas
- Marchamp
- Montagnieu
- Ordonnaz
- Saint-Benoît
- Seillonnaz
- Serrières-de-Briord

== Demographics ==
Historical population Canton of Lhuis
Year	1962	1968	1975	1982	1990	1999
Pop.	3,536	3,903	3,750	3,996	3,977	4,496
±%	—	+10.4%	−3.9%	+6.6%	−0.5%	+13.1%
From the year 1962 on: No double counting – residents of multiple communes (e.g. students and military personnel) are counted only once. Source: INSEE

== See also ==
- Cantons of the Ain department
