= Arrondissement of Belley =

Coordinates: 45°46′N 5°40′E

Belley
- Arrondissement
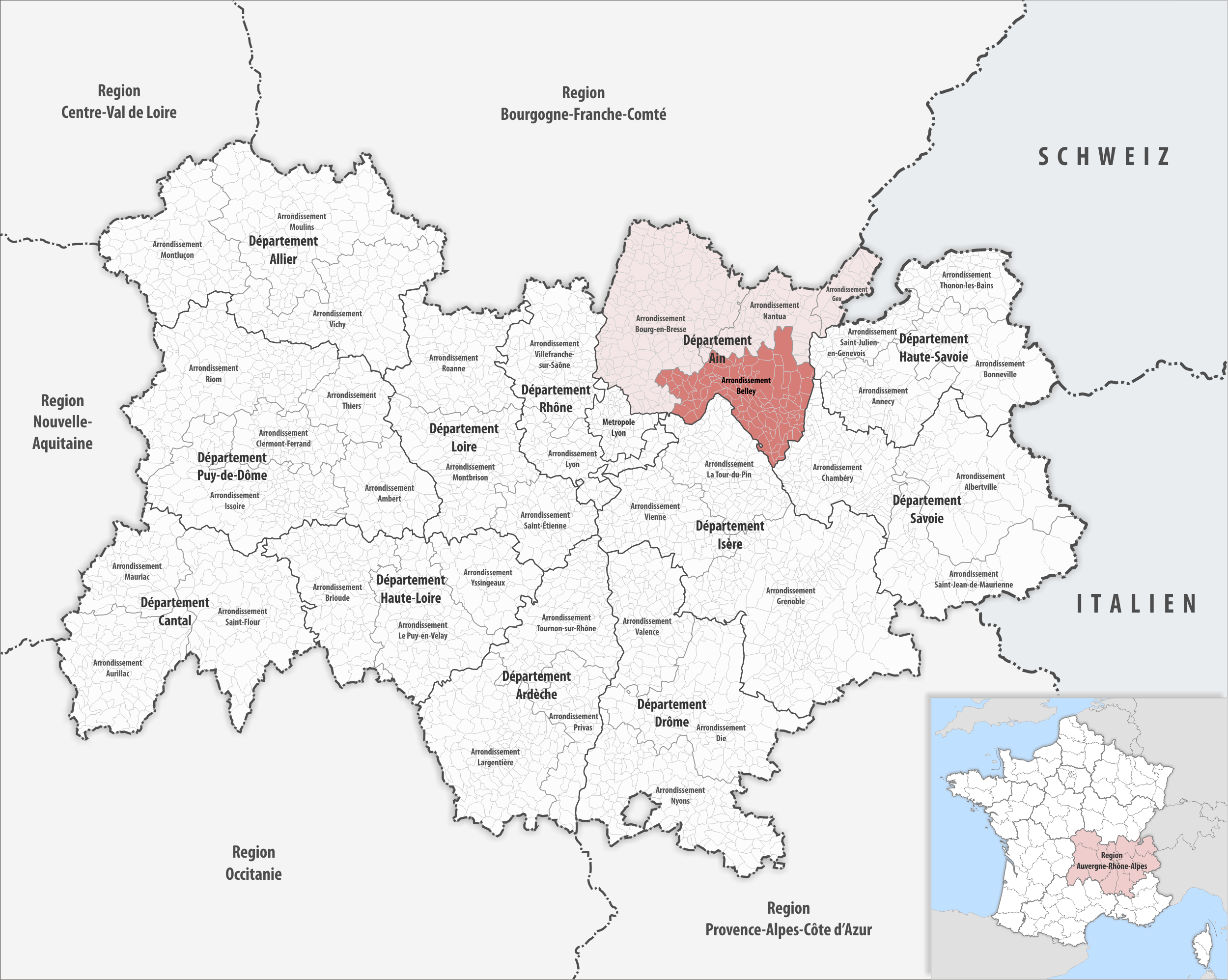
- Location within the region Auvergne-Rhône-Alpes
- Country: France
- Region: Auvergne-Rhône-Alpes
- Department: Ain
- No. of communes: {{{nbcomm}}}
- Area: 1,584.2 km^{2} (611.7 sq mi)
- Population (2023): 127,914
  - Density: 80.744/km^{2} (209.12/sq mi)
- INSEE code: 011

The arrondissement of Belley is an arrondissement of France in the Ain department in the Auvergne-Rhône-Alpes region. It has 103 communes. Its population is 124,868 (2021), and its area is 1,584.2 km^{2} (611.7 sq mi).

== Composition ==
The communes of the arrondissement of Belley, and their INSEE codes, are:

1. L'Abergement-de-Varey (01002)
2. Ambérieu-en-Bugey (01004)
3. Ambléon (01006)
4. Ambronay (01007)
5. Ambutrix (01008)
6. Andert-et-Condon (01009)
7. Anglefort (01010)
8. Aranc (01012)
9. Arandas (01013)
10. Arboys-en-Bugey (01015)
11. Argis (01017)
12. Armix (01019)
13. Artemare (01022)
14. Arvière-en-Valromey (01453)
15. Belley (01034)
16. Bénonces (01037)
17. Bettant (01041)
18. Blyes (01047)
19. Bourg-Saint-Christophe (01054)
20. Brégnier-Cordon (01058)
21. Brens (01061)
22. Briord (01064)
23. La Burbanche (01066)
24. Ceyzérieu (01073)
25. Chaley (01076)
26. Champagne-en-Valromey (01079)
27. Champdor-Corcelles (01080)
28. Charnoz-sur-Ain (01088)
29. Château-Gaillard (01089)
30. Chazey-Bons (01098)
31. Chazey-sur-Ain (01099)
32. Cheignieu-la-Balme (01100)
33. Cleyzieu (01107)
34. Colomieu (01110)
35. Conand (01111)
36. Contrevoz (01116)
37. Conzieu (01117)
38. Corbonod (01118)
39. Corlier (01121)
40. Cressin-Rochefort (01133)
41. Culoz-Béon (01138)
42. Cuzieu (01141)
43. Douvres (01149)
44. Évosges (01155)
45. Faramans (01156)
46. Flaxieu (01162)
47. Groslée-Saint-Benoît (01338)
48. Haut-Valromey (01187)
49. Innimond (01190)
50. Izieu (01193)
51. Joyeux (01198)
52. Lagnieu (01202)
53. Lavours (01208)
54. Leyment (01213)
55. Lhuis (01216)
56. Lompnas (01219)
57. Loyettes (01224)
58. Magnieu (01227)
59. Marchamp (01233)
60. Marignieu (01234)
61. Massignieu-de-Rives (01239)
62. Meximieux (01244)
63. Montagnieu (01255)
64. Le Montellier (01260)
65. Murs-et-Gélignieux (01268)
66. Nivollet-Montgriffon (01277)
67. Oncieu (01279)
68. Ordonnaz (01280)
69. Parves-et-Nattages (01286)
70. Pérouges (01290)
71. Peyrieu (01294)
72. Plateau d'Hauteville (01185)
73. Pollieu (01302)
74. Prémeyzel (01310)
75. Prémillieu (01311)
76. Rignieux-le-Franc (01325)
77. Rossillon (01329)
78. Saint-Denis-en-Bugey (01345)
79. Sainte-Julie (01366)
80. Saint-Éloi (01349)
81. Saint-Germain-les-Paroisses (01358)
82. Saint-Jean-de-Niost (01361)
83. Saint-Martin-de-Bavel (01372)
84. Saint-Maurice-de-Gourdans (01378)
85. Saint-Maurice-de-Rémens (01379)
86. Saint-Rambert-en-Bugey (01384)
87. Saint-Sorlin-en-Bugey (01386)
88. Saint-Vulbas (01390)
89. Sault-Brénaz (01396)
90. Seillonnaz (01400)
91. Serrières-de-Briord (01403)
92. Seyssel (01407)
93. Souclin (01411)
94. Talissieu (01415)
95. Tenay (01416)
96. Torcieu (01421)
97. Valromey-sur-Séran (01036)
98. Vaux-en-Bugey (01431)
99. Villebois (01444)
100. Villieu-Loyes-Mollon (01450)
101. Virieu-le-Grand (01452)
102. Virignin (01454)
103. Vongnes (01456)

== History ==
The arrondissement of Belley was created in 1800. At the January 2017 reorganization of the arrondissements of Ain, it received 12 communes from the arrondissement of Bourg-en-Bresse and one from the arrondissement of Nantua, and it lost one commune to the arrondissement of Nantua.

As a result of the reorganisation of the cantons of France which came into effect in 2015, the borders of the cantons are no longer related to the borders of the arrondissements. The cantons of the arrondissement of Belley were, as of January 2015:

1. Ambérieu-en-Bugey
2. Belley
3. Champagne-en-Valromey
4. Hauteville-Lompnes
5. Lagnieu
6. Lhuis
7. Saint-Rambert-en-Bugey
8. Seyssel
9. Virieu-le-Grand
