= Blyes =

Commune in Auvergne-Rhône-Alpes, France

- Commune
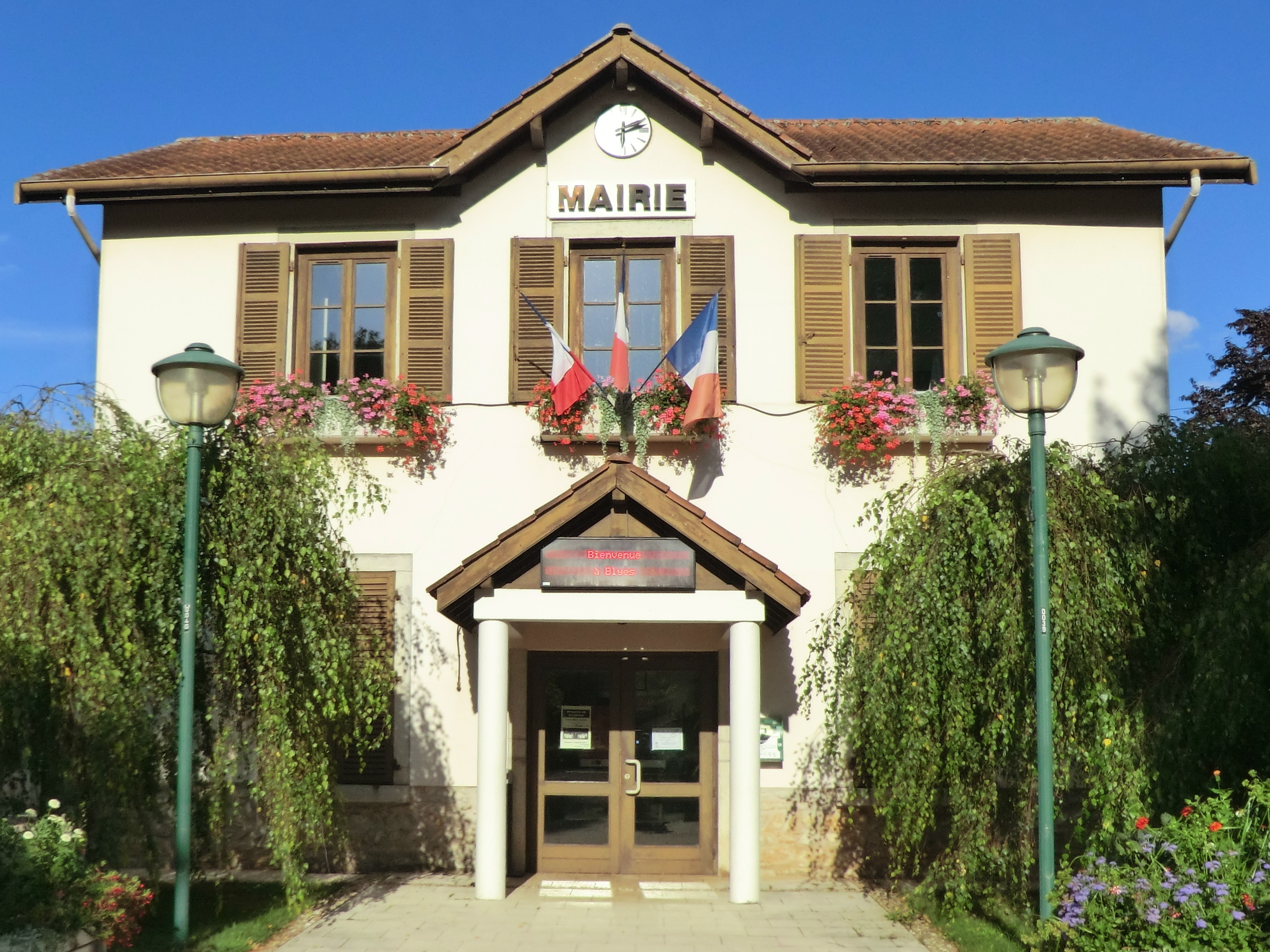
- Town hall

- Coat of arms
- Location of Blyes
- Location within France Location within Auvergne-Rhône-Alpes
- Coordinates: 45°51′N 5°15′E
- Country: France
- Region: Auvergne-Rhône-Alpes
- Department: Ain
- Arrondissement: Belley
- Canton: Lagnieu
- Intercommunality: Plaine de l'Ain

Government
  - Mayor (2026–32): Daniel Martin
- Area^{1}: 12.27 km^{2} (4.74 sq mi)
- Elevation: 210 m (690 ft)
- Highest elevation: 243 m (797 ft)
- Lowest elevation: 199 m (653 ft)
- Population (2023): 1,401
  - Density: 114.2/km^{2} (295.7/sq mi)
- Time zone: UTC+01:00 (CET)
  - Summer (DST): UTC+02:00 (CEST)
- INSEE/Postal code: 01047 /01150
- Website: https://www.blyes.fr/fr/
- ^{1} French Land Register data, which excludes lakes, ponds, glaciers > 1 km^{2} (0.386 sq mi or 247 acres) and river estuaries.

Blyes (French pronunciation: [bli]) is a commune in the Ain department in eastern France.

== Geography ==
Blyes lies 8 km from Lagnieu, 5 km from the A42, 10 km from Meximieux, 4 km from Saint-Vulbas, and 6 km from Chazey-sur-Ain. It is located not far from the river Ain.

== Population ==
Historical population
| Year | Pop. | ±% p.a. |
|---|---|---|
| 1968 | 147 | — |
| 1975 | 228 | +6.47% |
| 1982 | 359 | +6.70% |
| 1990 | 535 | +5.11% |
| 1999 | 692 | +2.90% |
| 2007 | 927 | +3.72% |
| 2012 | 915 | −0.26% |
| 2017 | 1,007 | +1.93% |
| 2023 | 1,401 | +5.66% |
Source: INSEE

== See also ==
- Communes of the Ain department
