= Ferdinand Ducarre =

French politician (1819–1883)

Personal details
- Born: Nicolas Ducarre; 21 November 1819 Lhuis, Ain, France
- Died: 1 July 1883 (aged 63) Lyon, Rhône, France
- Party: Gauche républicaine (1871–1885)
- Occupation: Industrialist, politician
- Known for: Member of the National Assembly for Rhône

Ferdinand Ducarre (French pronunciation: [fɛʁdinɑ̃ dykaʁ]; 21 November 1819, in Lhuis – 1 July 1883) was a French republican politician. He was a member of the National Assembly from 1871 to 1876. He belonged to the Opportunist Republican parliamentary group, Gauche républicaine. He was a founding member of the Société de Géographie of Lyon.
