= Saint-Jean-de-Niost =

Commune in Auvergne-Rhône-Alpes, France

- Commune
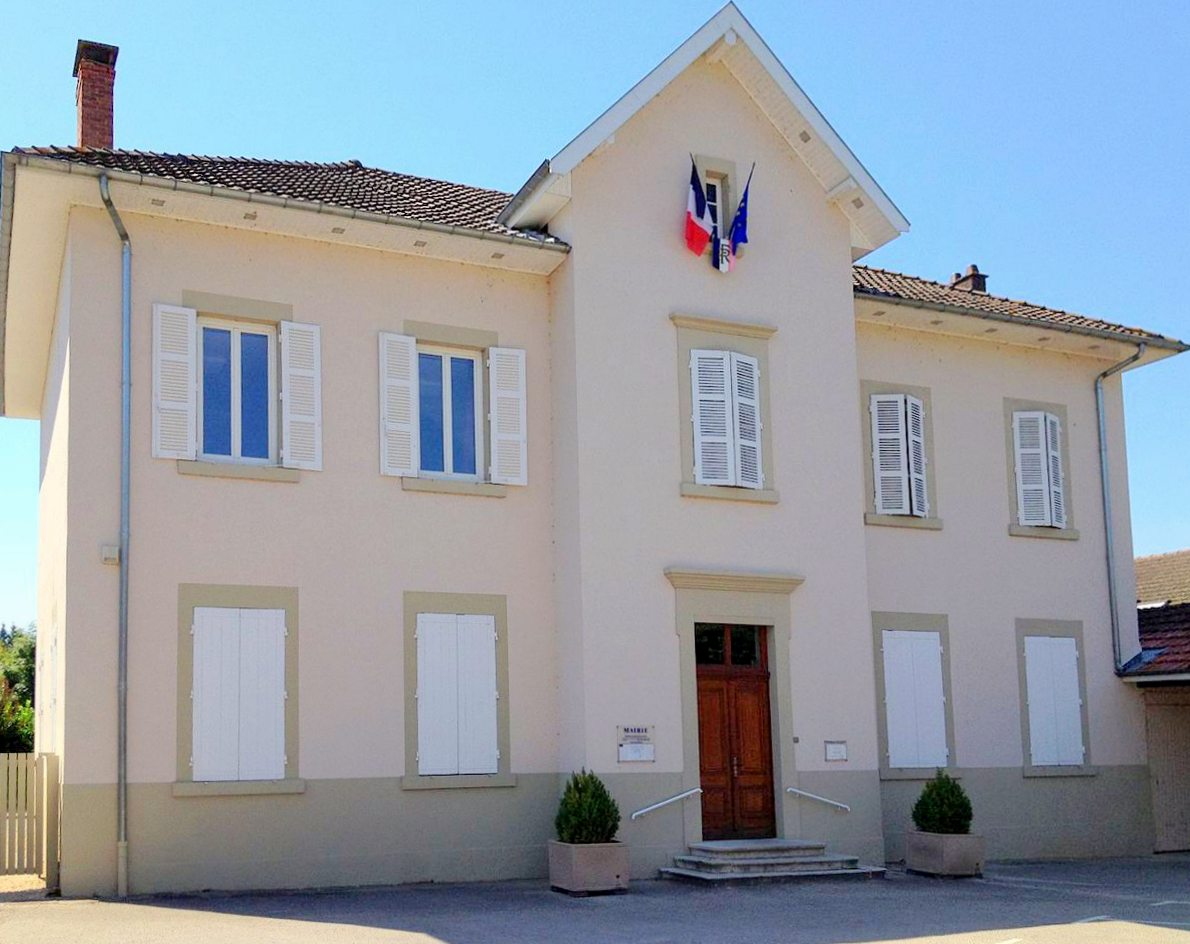
- Town hall

- Coat of arms
- Location of Saint-Jean-de-Niost
- Location within France Location within Auvergne-Rhône-Alpes
- Coordinates: 45°50′27″N 5°13′08″E
- Country: France
- Region: Auvergne-Rhône-Alpes
- Department: Ain
- Arrondissement: Belley
- Canton: Lagnieu
- Intercommunality: Plaine de l'Ain

Government
  - Mayor (2026–32): Béatrice Dalmaz
- Area^{1}: 14.19 km^{2} (5.48 sq mi)
- Elevation: 220 m (720 ft)
- Highest elevation: 242 m (794 ft)
- Lowest elevation: 193 m (633 ft)
- Population (2023): 1,866
  - Density: 131.5/km^{2} (340.6/sq mi)
- Time zone: UTC+01:00 (CET)
  - Summer (DST): UTC+02:00 (CEST)
- INSEE/Postal code: 01361 /01800
- ^{1} French Land Register data, which excludes lakes, ponds, glaciers > 1 km^{2} (0.386 sq mi or 247 acres) and river estuaries.

Saint-Jean-de-Niost (French pronunciation: [sɛ̃ ʒɑ̃ də njɔst]) is a commune in the Ain department in eastern France.

It lies on the edge of the Ain plain between Meximieux and Saint-Maurice-de-Gourdans.

== Population ==
Historical population
Year	Pop.	±% p.a.
1968	248	—
1975	369	+5.84%
1982	490	+4.13%
1990	810	+6.48%
1999	1,082	+3.27%
2007	1,390	+3.18%
2012	1,428	+0.54%
2017	1,477	+0.68%
2023	1,866	+3.97%
Source: INSEE

== See also ==
- Communes of the Ain department
