= Alain Gilles (designer) =

Belgian industrial and furniture designer

- Born: 1970 (age 55–56); Brussels, Belgium
- Education: Institut supérieur de design, Valenciennes
- Occupations: Industrial and furniture designer
- Years active: 2007–present
- Known for: Furniture and product design
- Awards: Designer of the Year (2012)

Alain Gilles (born 1970) is a Belgian industrial and furniture designer based in Brussels. His work includes furniture, lighting, acoustic workplace products and interior projects. He established his own studio in 2007 and has designed products for companies including Bonaldo, BuzziSpace, Ligne Roset, Vincent Sheppard and Greenmood. Gilles was named Designer of the Year at the 2012 Interieur design biennale in Kortrijk.

== Early life and education ==
Gilles was born in Brussels in 1970. During his adolescence, he lived for five years in the United States and later spent time in southern France. He studied political science and marketing management before working for five years in international finance.

At the age of 32, Gilles left finance and enrolled in an industrial-design programme at the Institut supérieur de design in Valenciennes, France. Before completing his studies, he began working for Quinze & Milan. He remained there for approximately two and a half years, contributing to projects involving manufacturers and architects including Moroso and Rem Koolhaas.

== Career ==
Gilles opened his Brussels studio in 2007. One of its first assignments was a furniture collection for the French company Qui est Paul?. Around the same period, the Italian manufacturer Bonaldo accepted his design for the Tectonic side tables.

The modular Tectonic tables use open steel grids and solid surfaces that can be combined into different geometric arrangements. The design received a Henry van de Velde label in 2008. In a 2021 article on the development of the coffee table, So Soir, a supplement of the Belgian newspaper Le Soir, identified Tectonic as Gilles's first commercial success.

His principal early breakthrough was the Big Table, introduced by Bonaldo in 2009. Its base consists of differently angled steel elements that change in appearance as the viewer moves around the table. The design received a Good Design Award and became one of Bonaldo's established products. Gilles and Bonaldo later developed a longer series of furniture, including the Welded, Tracks, Structure, Geometric and Padiglioni designs. A 2025 account of their collaboration described the Big Table as the project that established the partnership and remained the manufacturer's best-selling table after fifteen years.

Gilles also developed furniture intended for open-plan workplaces. His BuzziBooth, designed for BuzziSpace, is a sound-absorbing enclosure intended to provide a more private area within an open interior. It received a Henry van de Velde label in 2011. Later BuzziSpace projects included the BuzziSpark seating system, BuzziHat acoustic lighting and BuzziFloat chair. Discussing BuzziFloat with IndesignLive, Gilles said that its visual lightness was developed by separating the seat and back from the chair's supporting structure.

The Welded table, created for Bonaldo, received the Red Dot: Best of the Best distinction in the product-design category in 2013. His Structure sofa received another Henry van de Velde label in 2015. The sofa exposes parts of its metal support frame rather than concealing the structure inside its upholstered elements.

Other projects have included the Barry table for Miniforms, which combines a rounded top with a metal base, and the Padiglioni table for Bonaldo. The latter was influenced by the spatial arrangement of Ludwig Mies van der Rohe's Barcelona Pavilion and received a 2023 Good Design Award.

== Design approach ==
Gilles has described functionality as a starting point for his work, while using structure, colour and materials to give products a graphic character. His process often begins with the architecture of an object and then develops through additional visual layers and material contrasts.

He has connected the clear separation of materials in his designs with the ligne claire drawing style used in Belgian comics such as The Adventures of Tintin. Instead of disguising materials, he generally uses wood, metal and other elements in ways that retain their visible material qualities.

Writing about Gilles's work in 2021, Wallonie-Bruxelles Design Mode noted that his projects ranged from furniture and workplace products to footwear and public lighting. The profile also discussed his use of long-term collaboration with manufacturers as part of the development process.

== Recognition and exhibitions ==
Gilles received the Belgian Designer of the Year title in 2012, five years after establishing his studio. The award was associated with the Interieur biennale in Kortrijk and was supported by Belgian design institutions and publications.

His work was included in Design Generations: Intersections 5, an exhibition held at the Design Museum Brussels in 2018. The exhibition brought together ten Belgian designers and studios and examined products from different periods of Belgian design.

In 2022, Gilles presented an installation titled De la fragilité d'une idée à la matérialité as part of the Resonance programme of the Biennale de Lyon. The installation examined the transition of a design from an initial drawing and model to a manufactured object.

In September 2026, Brussels Design Week presented a solo exhibition marking nearly twenty years of Gilles's studio. BRUZZ described the Big Table as the design through which he first received wider recognition and noted his subsequent work with international manufacturers. The exhibition was also covered in the cultural listings of Le Soir.
