= Sault-Brénaz =

Commune in Auvergne-Rhône-Alpes, France

- Commune
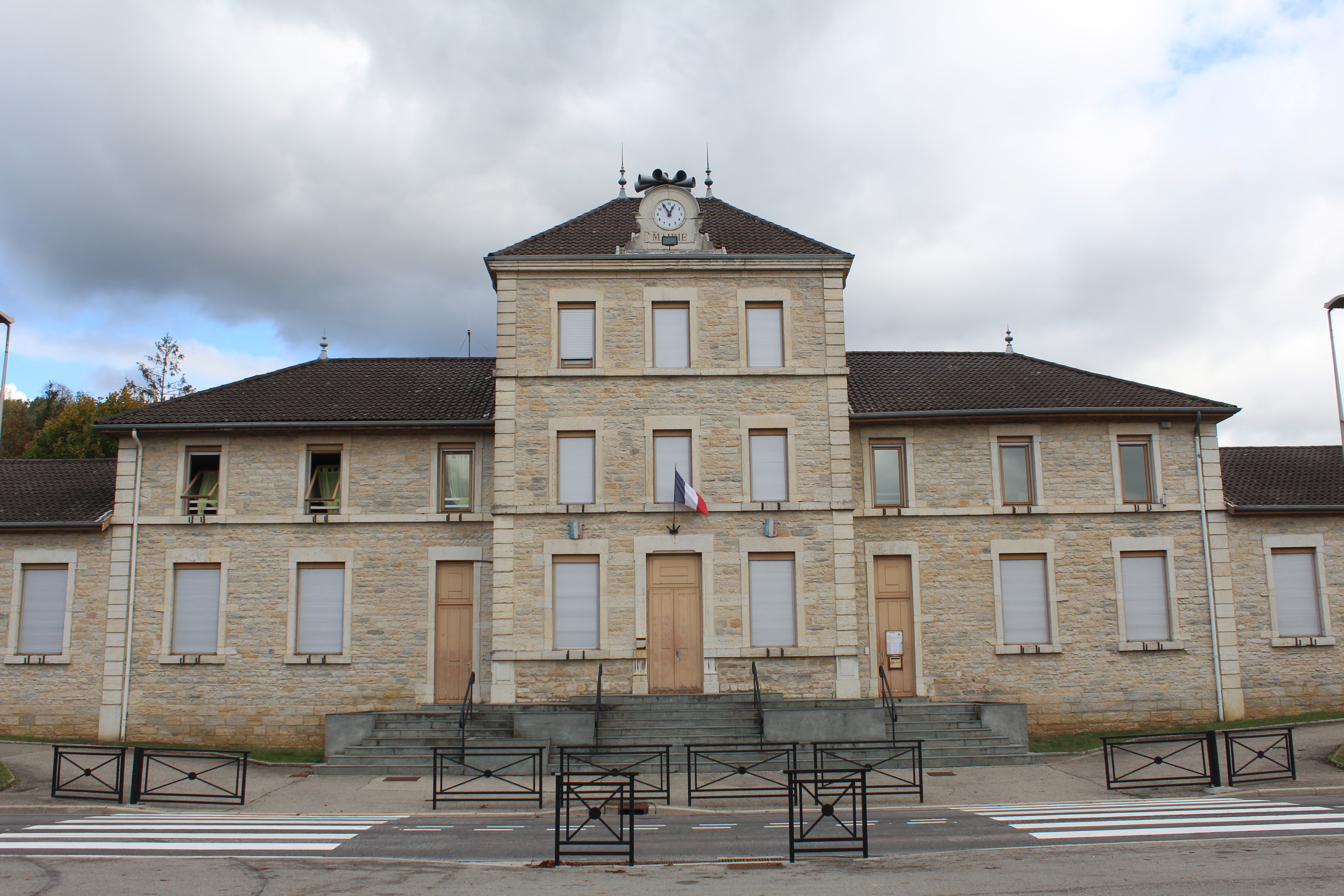
- Town hall

- Coat of arms
- Location of Sault-Brénaz
- Location within France Location within Auvergne-Rhône-Alpes
- Coordinates: 45°51′00″N 5°25′00″E
- Country: France
- Region: Auvergne-Rhône-Alpes
- Department: Ain
- Arrondissement: Belley
- Canton: Lagnieu
- Intercommunality: Plaine de l'Ain

Government
  - Mayor (2026–32): Nazarello Alonso
- Area^{1}: 5.61 km^{2} (2.17 sq mi)
- Elevation: 210 m (690 ft)
- Highest elevation: 660 m (2,170 ft)
- Lowest elevation: 196 m (643 ft)
- Population (2023): 1,021
  - Density: 182/km^{2} (471/sq mi)
- Time zone: UTC+01:00 (CET)
  - Summer (DST): UTC+02:00 (CEST)
- INSEE/Postal code: 01396 /01150
- ^{1} French Land Register data, which excludes lakes, ponds, glaciers > 1 km^{2} (0.386 sq mi or 247 acres) and river estuaries.

Sault-Brénaz is a commune in the Ain department in eastern France.

== Population ==
Historical population
Year	Pop.	±% p.a.
1968	937	—
1975	1,059	+1.76%
1982	1,070	+0.15%
1990	1,014	−0.67%
1999	973	−0.46%
2007	1,043	+0.87%
2012	1,029	−0.27%
2017	953	−1.52%
2023	1,021	+1.16%
Source: INSEE

== See also ==
- Communes of the Ain department
