= Souclin =

Commune in Auvergne-Rhône-Alpes, France

- Commune
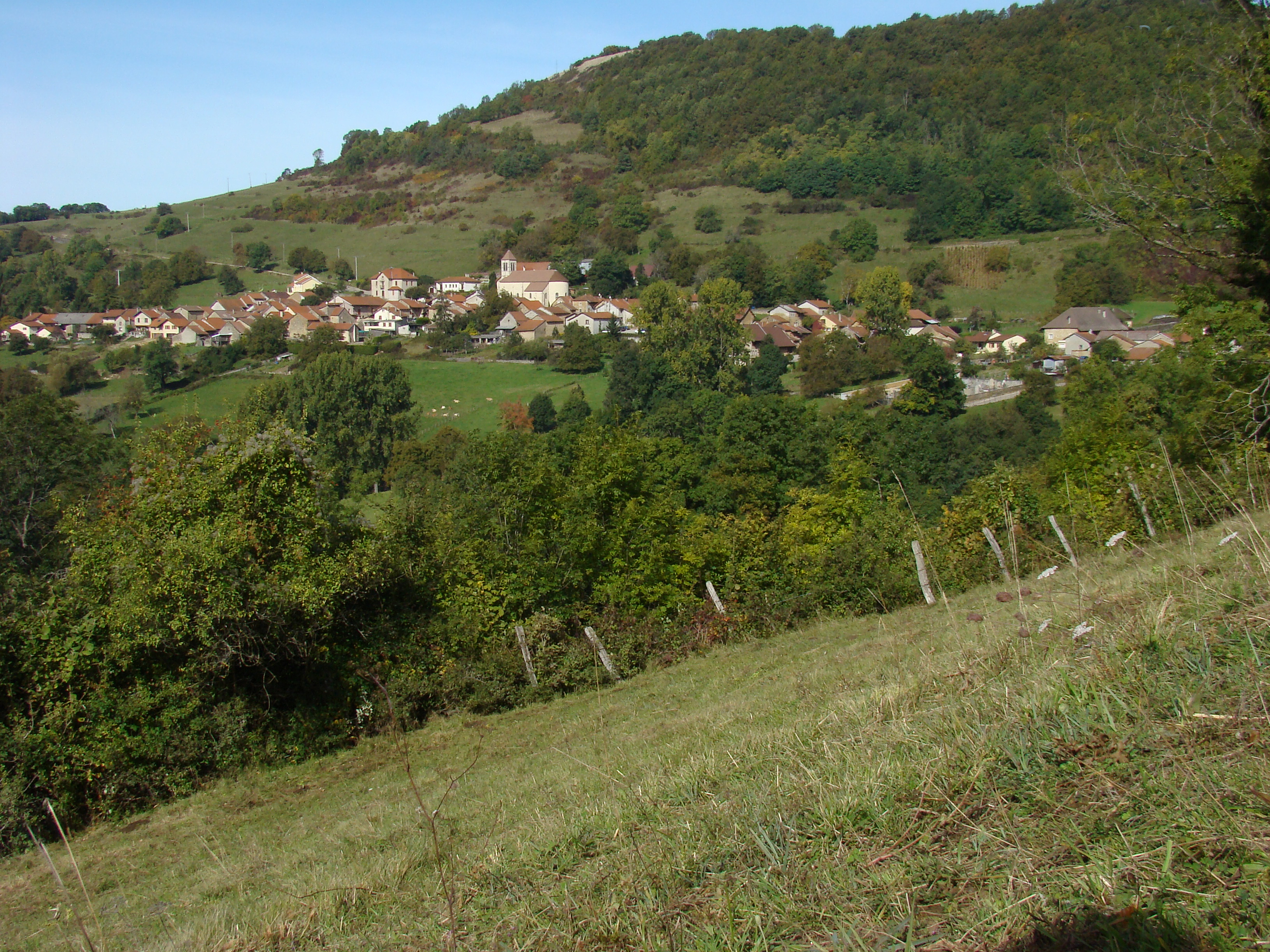

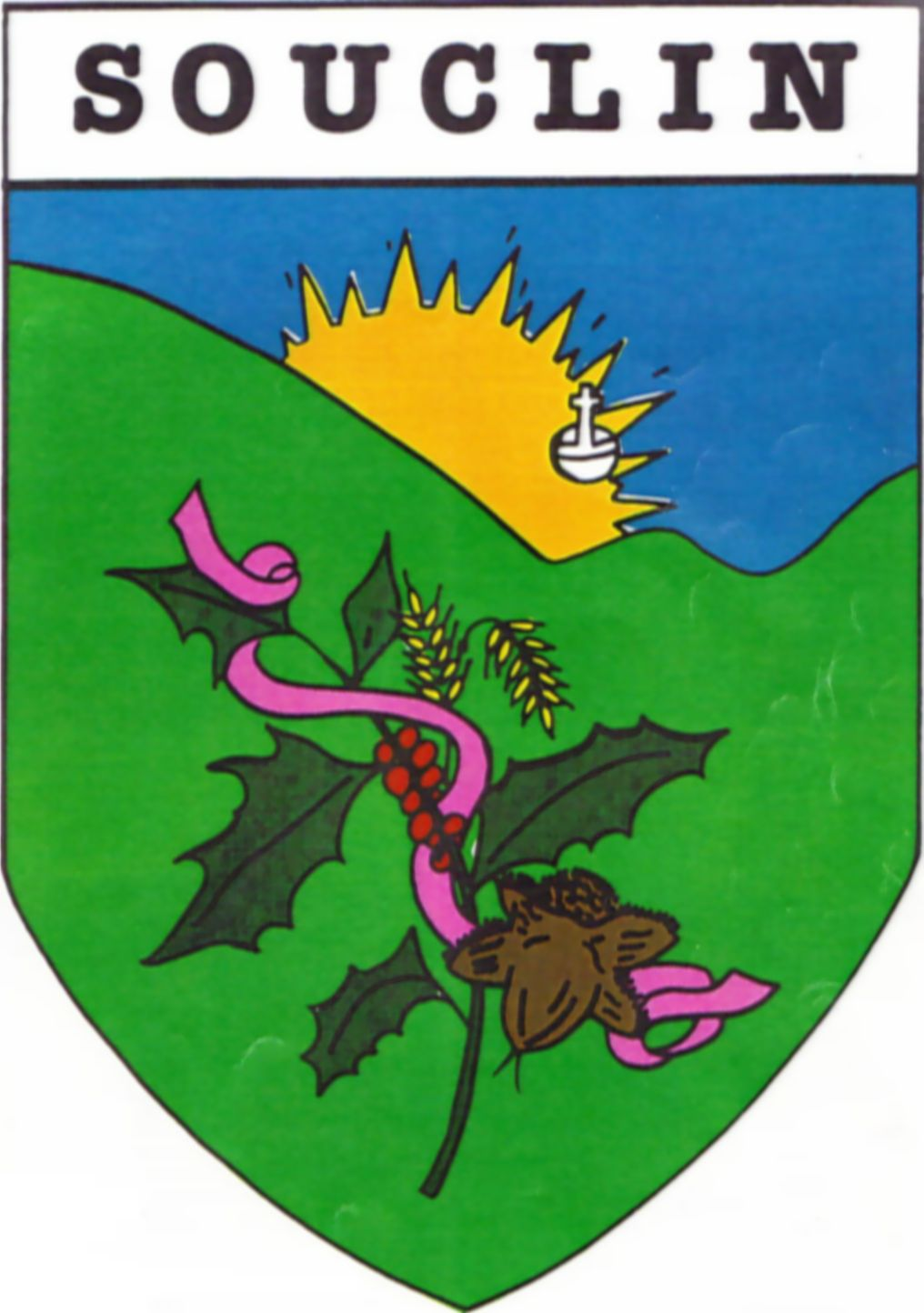
- Coat of arms
- Location of Souclin
- Location within France Location within Auvergne-Rhône-Alpes
- Coordinates: 45°52′00″N 5°25′00″E
- Country: France
- Region: Auvergne-Rhône-Alpes
- Department: Ain
- Arrondissement: Belley
- Canton: Lagnieu
- Intercommunality: Plaine de l'Ain

Government
  - Mayor (2026–32): Morgan Cornefert
- Area^{1}: 13.19 km^{2} (5.09 sq mi)
- Elevation: 600 m (2,000 ft)
- Highest elevation: 1,064 m (3,491 ft)
- Lowest elevation: 420 m (1,380 ft)
- Population (2023): 262
  - Density: 19.9/km^{2} (51.4/sq mi)
- Time zone: UTC+01:00 (CET)
  - Summer (DST): UTC+02:00 (CEST)
- INSEE/Postal code: 01411 /01150
- ^{1} French Land Register data, which excludes lakes, ponds, glaciers > 1 km^{2} (0.386 sq mi or 247 acres) and river estuaries.

Souclin (French pronunciation: [suklɛ̃]) is a commune in the Ain department in eastern France.

== Population ==
Historical population
Year	Pop.	±% p.a.
1968	190	—
1975	190	+0.00%
1982	200	+0.74%
1990	197	−0.19%
1999	221	+1.29%
2007	255	+1.80%
2012	263	+0.62%
2017	273	+0.75%
2023	262	−0.68%
Source: INSEE

== See also ==
- Communes of the Ain department
