= Sainte-Julie, Ain =

Commune in Auvergne-Rhône-Alpes, France

Sainte-Julie
- Commune
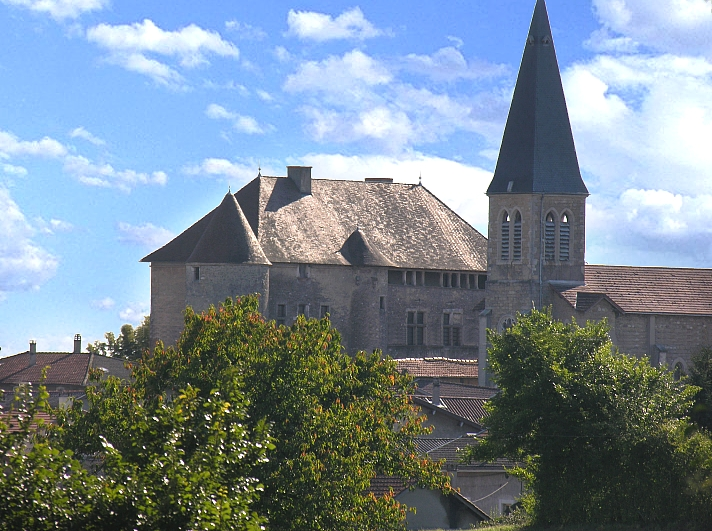
- Castle and church
- Location of Sainte-Julie
- Location within France Location within Auvergne-Rhône-Alpes
- Coordinates: 46°07′11″N 4°47′15″E
- Country: France
- Region: Auvergne-Rhône-Alpes
- Department: Ain
- Arrondissement: Belley
- Canton: Lagnieu
- Intercommunality: Plaine de l'Ain

Government
  - Mayor (2026–32): Lionel Chappellaz
- Area^{1}: 11.15 km^{2} (4.31 sq mi)
- Highest elevation: 259 m (850 ft)
- Lowest elevation: 225 m (738 ft)
- Population (2023): 1,094
  - Density: 98.12/km^{2} (254.1/sq mi)
- Time zone: UTC+01:00 (CET)
  - Summer (DST): UTC+02:00 (CEST)
- INSEE/Postal code: 01366 /01150
- ^{1} French Land Register data, which excludes lakes, ponds, glaciers > 1 km^{2} (0.386 sq mi or 247 acres) and river estuaries.

Sainte-Julie (French pronunciation: [sɛ̃t ʒyli]) is a commune in the Ain department in eastern France.

== Population ==
Historical population
Year	Pop.	±% p.a.
1968	301	—
1975	327	+1.19%
1982	331	+0.17%
1990	529	+6.04%
1999	535	+0.13%
2007	823	+5.53%
2012	934	+2.56%
2017	1,017	+1.72%
2023	1,094	+1.22%
Source: INSEE

== See also ==
- Communes of the Ain department
