= Villebois =

Commune in Auvergne-Rhône-Alpes, France

- Commune
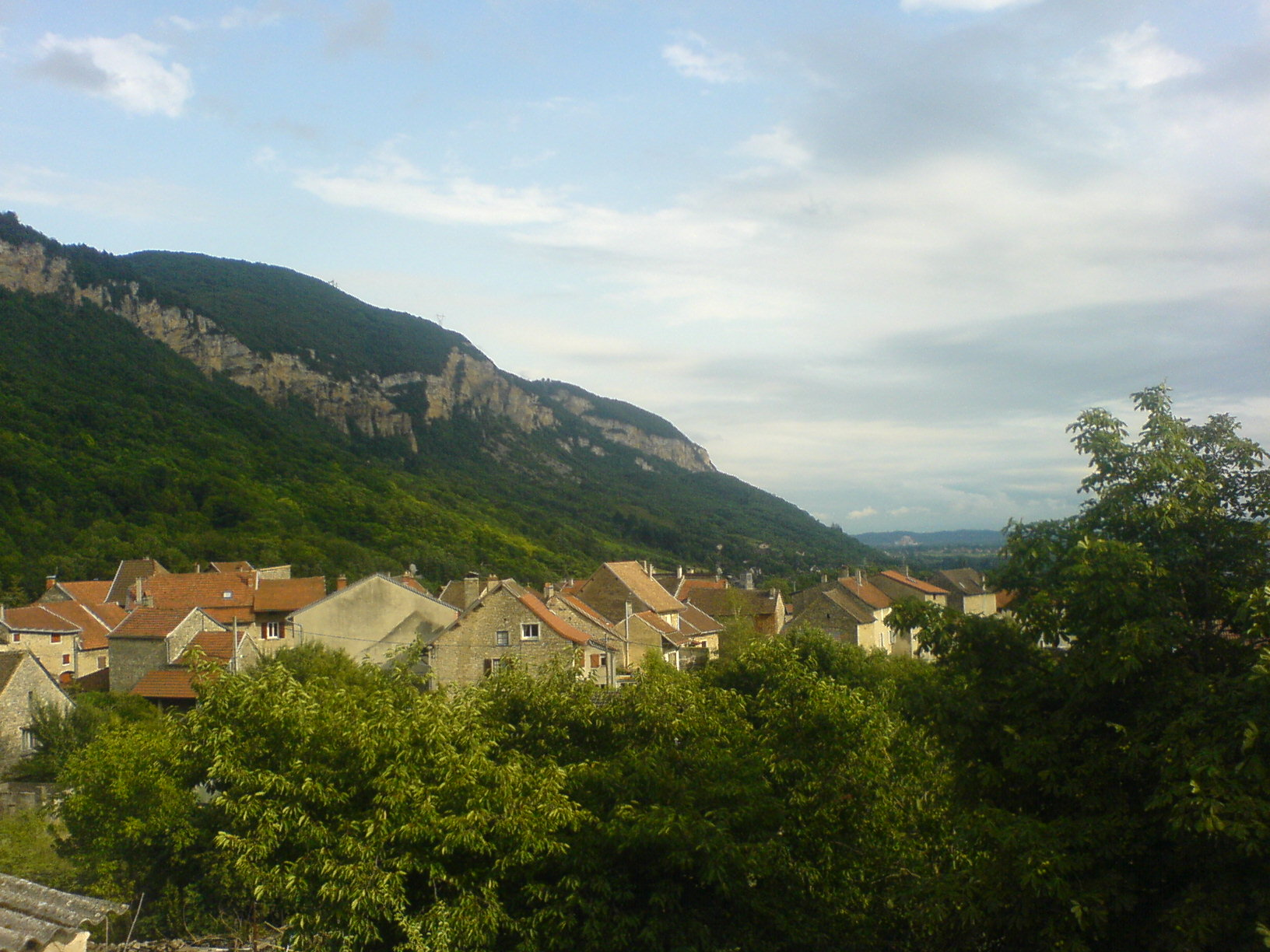

- Coat of arms
- Location of Villebois
- Location within France Location within Auvergne-Rhône-Alpes
- Coordinates: 45°50′37″N 5°26′09″E
- Country: France
- Region: Auvergne-Rhône-Alpes
- Department: Ain
- Arrondissement: Belley
- Canton: Lagnieu
- Intercommunality: Plaine de l'Ain

Government
  - Mayor (2026–32): Cécile Vigier
- Area^{1}: 14.46 km^{2} (5.58 sq mi)
- Highest elevation: 960 m (3,150 ft)
- Lowest elevation: 195 m (640 ft)
- Population (2023): 1,206
  - Density: 83.40/km^{2} (216.0/sq mi)
- Time zone: UTC+01:00 (CET)
  - Summer (DST): UTC+02:00 (CEST)
- INSEE/Postal code: 01444 /01150
- ^{1} French Land Register data, which excludes lakes, ponds, glaciers > 1 km^{2} (0.386 sq mi or 247 acres) and river estuaries.

Villebois (French pronunciation: [vilbwa]) is a commune in the Ain department in eastern France.

== Population ==
Historical population
Year	Pop.	±% p.a.
1968	779	—
1975	758	−0.39%
1982	851	+1.67%
1990	924	+1.03%
1999	954	+0.36%
2007	1,098	+1.77%
2012	1,158	+1.07%
2017	1,173	+0.26%
2023	1,206	+0.46%
Source: INSEE

== See also ==
- Communes of the Ain department
