= Ligne Roset =

French modern furniture company

- Company type: Private
- Industry: High-end furniture and home interiors
- Founded: 1860 in Montagnieu, Ain, France
- Headquarters: Briord, Ain, France
- Key people: Pierre Roset; Michel Roset; Antoine Roset
- Number of employees: 1,000+
- Website: www.ligne-roset-usa.com

Ligne Roset (French pronunciation: [liɲ ʁozɛ]; stylized as ligne roset) is a French modern furniture company that has over 200 stores and more than 1,000 retail distributors worldwide. The company was founded by Antoine Roset in 1860 in Montagnieu, France as a small business manufacturing bentwood walking sticks. In 1936, the company started manufacturing upholstered furniture and presently they design and manufacture household furniture, lighting, accessories, and textiles from a team of 50 European designers.

Among Ligne Roset's most recognized pieces is the Togo line of seating, designed by Michel Ducaroy in 1973. It features ergonomic designs with five densities of foam combined to make the frame, and quilted covers.

Known for its collaborations with contemporary designers, Ligne Roset sells furniture, decorative accessories, lighting, rugs, textiles and occasional items.

The company uses in-house manufacturing, supervising the entire product creation process. A family-run company since its inception in 1860, Ligne Roset has become a multinational company with factories and headquarters in France and more than 200 exclusive stores and 1,000 retail distributors worldwide.

== Notable designs ==
- 2007 Sofa Moël by Inga Sempé
