= Leyment =

Commune in Auvergne-Rhône-Alpes, France

- Commune
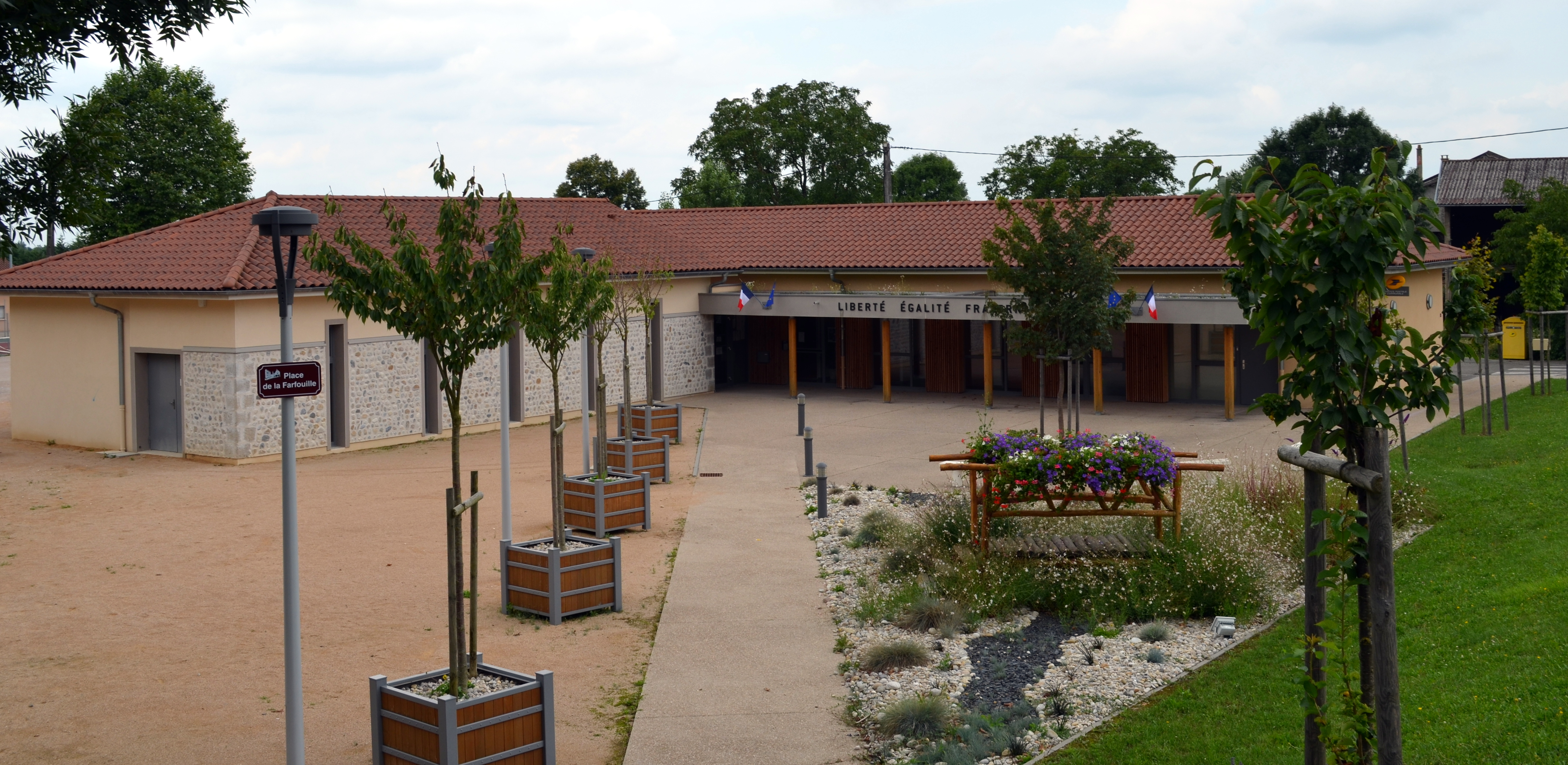
- Town hall
- Location of Leyment
- Location within France Location within Auvergne-Rhône-Alpes
- Coordinates: 45°55′00″N 5°18′00″E
- Country: France
- Region: Auvergne-Rhône-Alpes
- Department: Ain
- Arrondissement: Belley
- Canton: Lagnieu
- Intercommunality: Plaine de l'Ain

Government
  - Mayor (2022–2026): Lionel Klingler
- Area^{1}: 14.18 km^{2} (5.47 sq mi)
- Elevation: 260 m (850 ft)
- Highest elevation: 321 m (1,053 ft)
- Lowest elevation: 221 m (725 ft)
- Population (2023): 1,441
  - Density: 101.6/km^{2} (263.2/sq mi)
- Time zone: UTC+01:00 (CET)
  - Summer (DST): UTC+02:00 (CEST)
- INSEE/Postal code: 01213 /01150
- ^{1} French Land Register data, which excludes lakes, ponds, glaciers > 1 km^{2} (0.386 sq mi or 247 acres) and river estuaries.

Leyment (French pronunciation: [lɛmɑ̃]) is a commune in the Ain department in eastern France.

== Geography ==
The river Albarine forms part of the commune's northern border.

== Population ==
Historical population
Year	Pop.	±% p.a.
1968	522	—
1975	552	+0.80%
1982	540	−0.31%
1990	822	+5.39%
1999	922	+1.28%
2007	1,222	+3.58%
2012	1,257	+0.57%
2017	1,303	+0.72%
2023	1,441	+1.69%
Source: INSEE

== See also ==
- Communes of the Ain department
