= Saint-Sorlin-en-Bugey =

Commune in Auvergne-Rhône-Alpes, France

- Commune
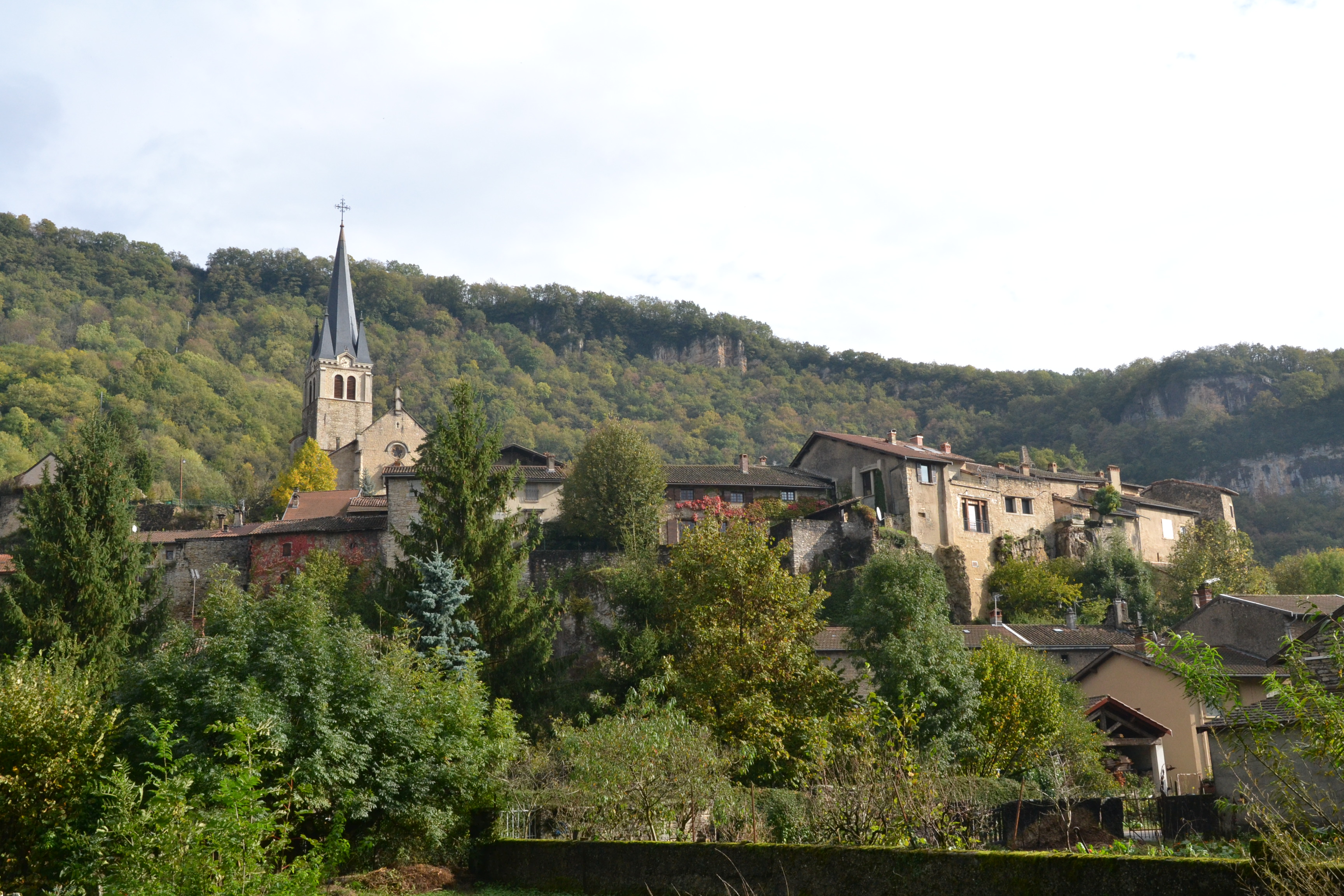

- Coat of arms
- Location of Saint-Sorlin-en-Bugey
- Location within France Location within Auvergne-Rhône-Alpes
- Coordinates: 45°53′00″N 5°22′00″E
- Country: France
- Region: Auvergne-Rhône-Alpes
- Department: Ain
- Arrondissement: Belley
- Canton: Lagnieu
- Intercommunality: Plaine de l'Ain

Government
  - Mayor (2026–32): Patrick Millet
- Area^{1}: 9.07 km^{2} (3.50 sq mi)
- Elevation: 200 m (660 ft)
- Highest elevation: 700 m (2,300 ft)
- Lowest elevation: 196 m (643 ft)
- Population (2023): 1,152
  - Density: 127/km^{2} (329/sq mi)
- Time zone: UTC+01:00 (CET)
  - Summer (DST): UTC+02:00 (CEST)
- INSEE/Postal code: 01386 /01150
- ^{1} French Land Register data, which excludes lakes, ponds, glaciers > 1 km^{2} (0.386 sq mi or 247 acres) and river estuaries.

Saint-Sorlin-en-Bugey (French pronunciation: [sɛ̃ sɔʁlɛ̃ ɑ̃ byʒɛ], literally Saint-Sorlin in Bugey) is a commune in the Ain department in eastern France.

== Population ==
Historical population
Year	Pop.	±% p.a.
1968	559	—
1975	629	+1.70%
1982	690	+1.33%
1990	832	+2.37%
1999	939	+1.35%
2007	1,064	+1.57%
2012	1,068	+0.08%
2017	1,157	+1.61%
2023	1,152	−0.07%
Source: INSEE

== See also ==
- Communes of the Ain department
