= Charnoz-sur-Ain =

Commune in Auvergne-Rhône-Alpes, France

Charnoz-sur-Ain Charenôsc (Arpitan)
- Commune
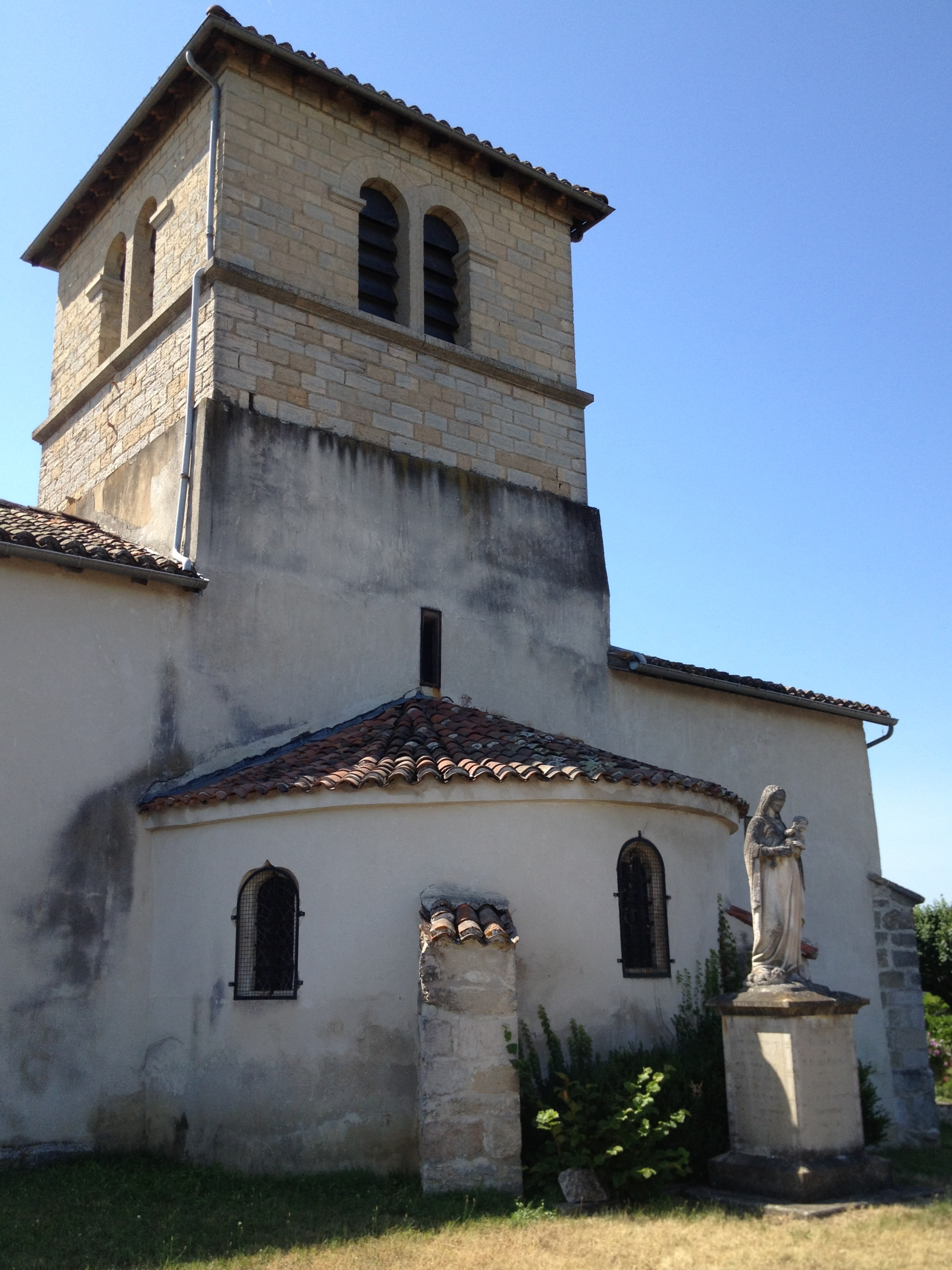
- Church of the Assumption

- Coat of arms
- Location of Charnoz-sur-Ain
- Location within France Location within Auvergne-Rhône-Alpes
- Coordinates: 45°52′23″N 5°13′21″E
- Country: France
- Region: Auvergne-Rhône-Alpes
- Department: Ain
- Arrondissement: Belley
- Canton: Lagnieu
- Intercommunality: Plaine de l'Ain

Government
  - Mayor (2026–32): Jean-Louis Guyader
- Area^{1}: 6.62 km^{2} (2.56 sq mi)
- Elevation: 229 m (751 ft)
- Highest elevation: 244 m (801 ft)
- Lowest elevation: 203 m (666 ft)
- Population (2023): 951
  - Density: 144/km^{2} (372/sq mi)
- Time zone: UTC+01:00 (CET)
  - Summer (DST): UTC+02:00 (CEST)
- INSEE/Postal code: 01088 /01800
- ^{1} French Land Register data, which excludes lakes, ponds, glaciers > 1 km^{2} (0.386 sq mi or 247 acres) and river estuaries.

Charnoz-sur-Ain (before 1991: Charnoz; Arpitan: Charenôsc [θar.ˈnu]) is a commune in the Ain department in eastern France.

== Population ==
Historical population
Year	Pop.	±% p.a.
1968	141	—
1975	155	+1.36%
1982	267	+8.08%
1990	416	+5.70%
1999	810	+7.68%
2007	900	+1.33%
2012	914	+0.31%
2017	913	−0.02%
2023	951	+0.68%
Source: INSEE

== See also ==
- Communes of the Ain department
