= Loyettes =

Commune in Auvergne-Rhône-Alpes, France

- Commune
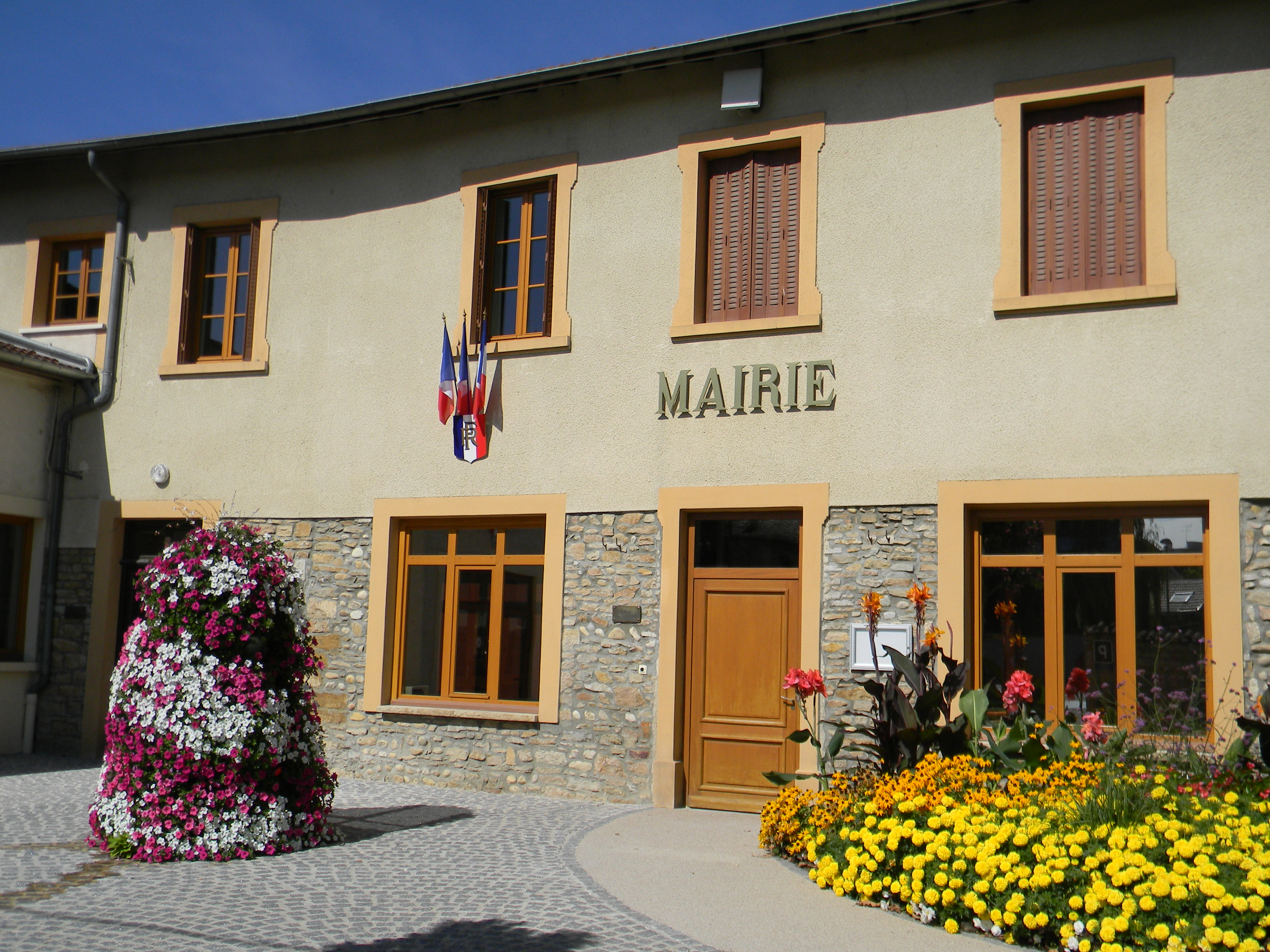
- Town hall

- Coat of arms
- Location of Loyettes
- Location within France Location within Auvergne-Rhône-Alpes
- Coordinates: 45°46′31″N 5°12′26″E
- Country: France
- Region: Auvergne-Rhône-Alpes
- Department: Ain
- Arrondissement: Belley
- Canton: Lagnieu
- Intercommunality: Plaine de l'Ain

Government
  - Mayor (2020–2026): Jean-Pierre Gagne
- Area^{1}: 21.28 km^{2} (8.22 sq mi)
- Elevation: 192 m (630 ft)
- Highest elevation: 204 m (669 ft)
- Lowest elevation: 185 m (607 ft)
- Population (2023): 3,554
  - Density: 167.0/km^{2} (432.6/sq mi)
- Time zone: UTC+01:00 (CET)
  - Summer (DST): UTC+02:00 (CEST)
- INSEE/Postal code: 01224 /01360
- ^{1} French Land Register data, which excludes lakes, ponds, glaciers > 1 km^{2} (0.386 sq mi or 247 acres) and river estuaries.

Loyette (French pronunciation: [lɔjɛt]) is a commune in the Ain department in eastern France.

== Geography ==
=== Climate ===
Loyettes has an oceanic climate (Köppen climate classification Cfb). The average annual temperature in Loyettes is 12.1 °C (53.8 °F). The average annual rainfall is 1,012.3 mm (39.85 in) with October as the wettest month. The temperatures are highest on average in July, at around 21.5 °C (70.7 °F), and lowest in January, at around 3.0 °C (37.4 °F). The highest temperature ever recorded in Loyettes was 43.0 °C (109.4 °F) on 13 August 2003; the coldest temperature ever recorded was −17.0 °C (1.4 °F) on 20 December 2009.

Climate data for Loyettes (1981–2010 averages, extremes 1990-2019)
Month	Jan	Feb	Mar	Apr	May	Jun	Jul	Aug	Sep	Oct	Nov	Dec	Year
Record high °C (°F)	17.5 (63.5)	22.5 (72.5)	27.0 (80.6)	32.0 (89.6)	36.0 (96.8)	41.0 (105.8)	41.5 (106.7)	43.0 (109.4)	35.0 (95.0)	29.5 (85.1)	23.0 (73.4)	18.0 (64.4)	43.0 (109.4)
Mean daily maximum °C (°F)	6.2 (43.2)	8.9 (48.0)	14.1 (57.4)	17.5 (63.5)	22.6 (72.7)	26.3 (79.3)	28.7 (83.7)	28.5 (83.3)	23.1 (73.6)	17.7 (63.9)	10.4 (50.7)	6.2 (43.2)	17.6 (63.7)
Daily mean °C (°F)	3.0 (37.4)	4.6 (40.3)	8.2 (46.8)	11.3 (52.3)	16.2 (61.2)	19.5 (67.1)	21.5 (70.7)	21.2 (70.2)	16.7 (62.1)	12.9 (55.2)	6.9 (44.4)	3.3 (37.9)	12.1 (53.8)
Mean daily minimum °C (°F)	−0.2 (31.6)	0.2 (32.4)	2.4 (36.3)	5.2 (41.4)	9.8 (49.6)	12.6 (54.7)	14.3 (57.7)	13.9 (57.0)	10.3 (50.5)	8.0 (46.4)	3.3 (37.9)	0.5 (32.9)	6.7 (44.1)
Record low °C (°F)	−13.5 (7.7)	−15.0 (5.0)	−11.0 (12.2)	−6.0 (21.2)	−1.5 (29.3)	4.0 (39.2)	5.5 (41.9)	4.0 (39.2)	0.0 (32.0)	−7.5 (18.5)	−10.5 (13.1)	−17.0 (1.4)	−17.0 (1.4)
Average precipitation mm (inches)	70.8 (2.79)	64.4 (2.54)	65.2 (2.57)	82.0 (3.23)	91.6 (3.61)	75.3 (2.96)	74.1 (2.92)	77.3 (3.04)	106.9 (4.21)	115.7 (4.56)	108.2 (4.26)	80.8 (3.18)	1,012.3 (39.85)
Average precipitation days (≥ 1.0 mm)	10.1	9.2	9.5	10.1	10.3	9.5	7.6	8.2	9.1	11.8	11.9	11.8	119.2
Source: Meteociel

== Population ==
Historical population

Year	Pop.	±% p.a.
1793	613	—
1800	549	−1.56%
1806	619	+2.02%
1821	782	+1.57%
1831	908	+1.51%
1836	960	+1.12%
1841	1,025	+1.32%
1846	1,055	+0.58%
1851	1,073	+0.34%
1856	1,114	+0.75%
1861	1,057	−1.04%
1866	1,080	+0.43%
1872	984	−1.54%
1876	1,005	+0.53%
1881	943	−1.27%
1886	896	−1.02%
1891	826	−1.61%
1896	824	−0.05%
1901	804	−0.49%

Year	Pop.	±% p.a.
1906	764	−1.02%
1911	750	−0.37%
1921	711	−0.53%
1926	768	+1.55%
1931	685	−2.26%
1936	685	+0.00%
1946	719	+0.49%
1954	814	+1.56%
1962	792	−0.34%
1968	1,001	+3.98%
1975	1,453	+5.47%
1982	1,713	+2.38%
1990	2,256	+3.50%
1999	2,322	+0.32%
2007	2,439	+0.62%
2012	3,004	+4.26%
2017	3,146	+0.93%
2023	3,554	+2.05%

Source: EHESS and INSEE (1968-2023)

== See also ==
- Communes of the Ain department
