= Canton of Lagnieu =

Coordinates: 45°54′11″N 5°20′52″E

Lagnieu
- Canton
- Interactive map of Lagnieu
- Country: France
- Region: Auvergne-Rhône-Alpes
- Department: Ain
- No. of communes: {{{nbcomm}}}

Government
  - Representatives (2021–2028): Charles de la Verpillière and Viviane Vaudray
- Area: 368.29 km^{2} (142.20 sq mi)
- Population (2023): 35,979
  - Density: 97.692/km^{2} (253.02/sq mi)
- INSEE code: 01 11

The canton of Lagnieu is an administrative division in eastern France. At the French canton reorganisation which came into effect in March 2015, the canton was expanded from 13 to 25 communes:

1. Bénonces
2. Blyes
3. Briord
4. Charnoz-sur-Ain
5. Chazey-sur-Ain
6. Innimond
7. Lagnieu
8. Leyment
9. Lhuis
10. Lompnas
11. Loyettes
12. Marchamp
13. Montagnieu
14. Ordonnaz
15. Sainte-Julie
16. Saint-Jean-de-Niost
17. Saint-Maurice-de-Gourdans
18. Saint-Sorlin-en-Bugey
19. Saint-Vulbas
20. Sault-Brénaz
21. Seillonnaz
22. Serrières-de-Briord
23. Souclin
24. Villebois
25. Villieu-Loyes-Mollon

== Demographics ==
Historical population
Year	Pop.	±% p.a.
2013	32,494	—
2018	34,098	+0.97%
Source: INSEE

== See also ==
- Cantons of the Ain department
- Communes of France
