= Briord =

Commune in Auvergne-Rhône-Alpes, France

- Commune
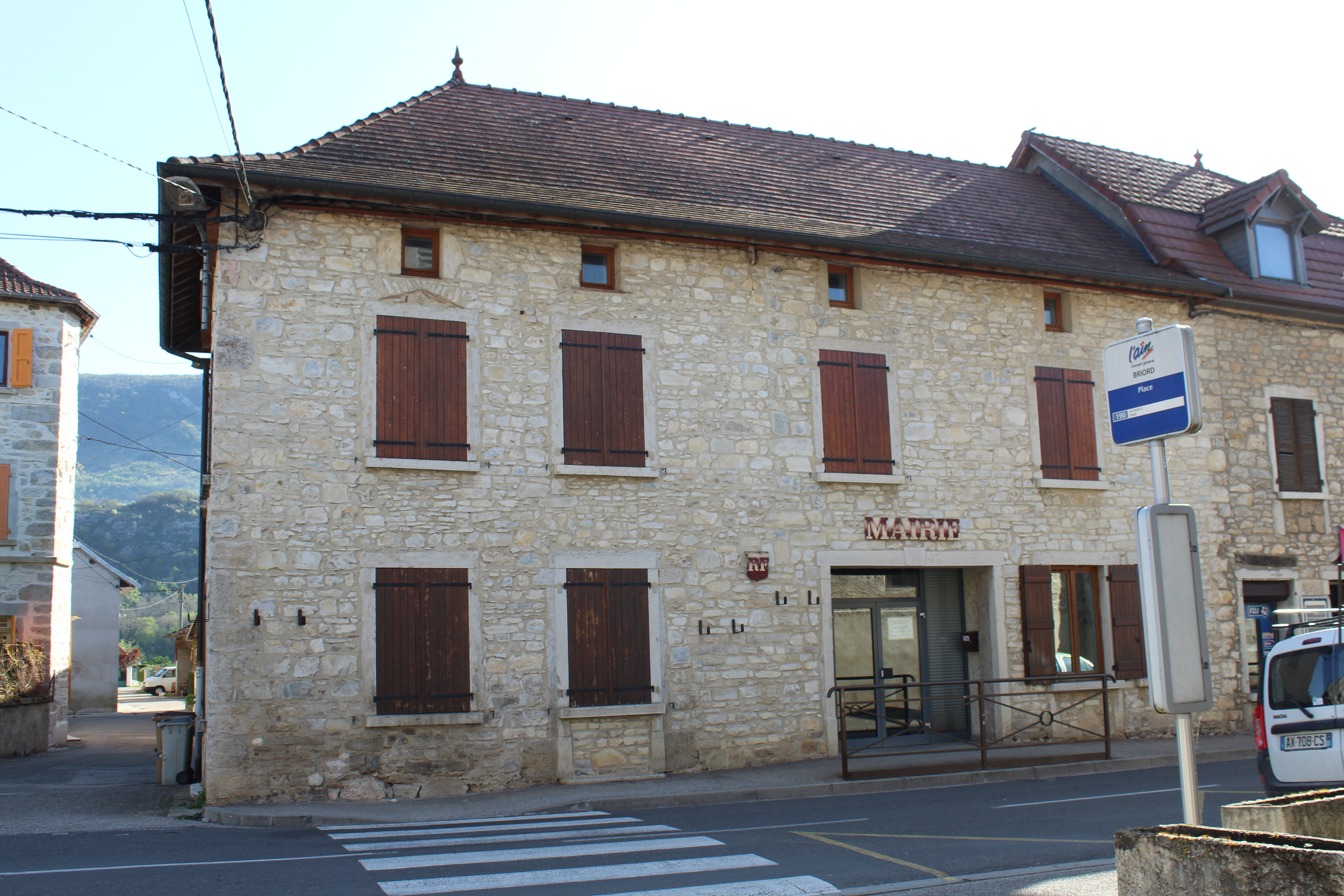
- Town hall
- Location of Briord
- Location within France Location within Auvergne-Rhône-Alpes
- Coordinates: 45°47′00″N 5°28′00″E
- Country: France
- Region: Auvergne-Rhône-Alpes
- Department: Ain
- Arrondissement: Belley
- Canton: Lagnieu
- Intercommunality: Plaine de l'Ain

Government
  - Mayor (2026–32): Serge Merle
- Area^{1}: 12.29 km^{2} (4.75 sq mi)
- Elevation: 205 m (673 ft)
- Highest elevation: 580 m (1,900 ft)
- Lowest elevation: 200 m (660 ft)
- Population (2023): 1,119
  - Density: 91.05/km^{2} (235.8/sq mi)
- Time zone: UTC+01:00 (CET)
  - Summer (DST): UTC+02:00 (CEST)
- INSEE/Postal code: 01064 /01470
- Website: https://www.briord.fr/
- ^{1} French Land Register data, which excludes lakes, ponds, glaciers > 1 km^{2} (0.386 sq mi or 247 acres) and river estuaries.

Briord (French pronunciation: [bʁijɔʁ]) is a commune in the Ain department in eastern France.

== Population ==
Historical population
Year	Pop.	±% p.a.
1968	393	—
1975	413	+0.71%
1982	520	+3.35%
1990	618	+2.18%
1999	675	+0.99%
2007	838	+2.74%
2012	919	+1.86%
2017	1,016	+2.03%
2023	1,119	+1.62%
Source: INSEE

== Economy ==
- Ligne Roset has its headquarters and a furniture factory in Briord.

== See also ==
- Communes of the Ain department
