= Ordonnaz =

Commune in Auvergne-Rhône-Alpes, France

- Commune
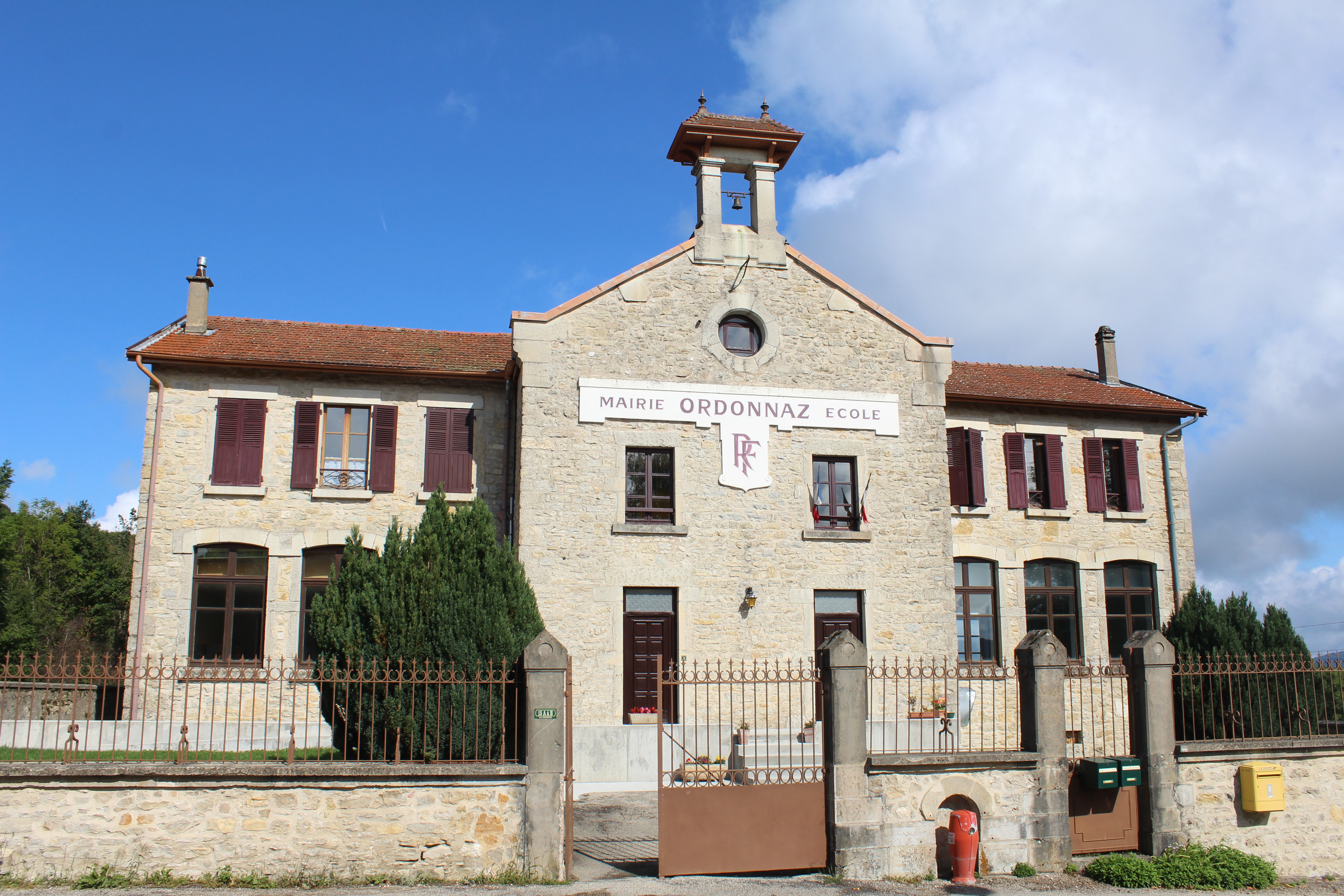
- Town hall
- Location of Ordonnaz
- Location within France Location within Auvergne-Rhône-Alpes
- Coordinates: 45°50′16″N 5°32′20″E
- Country: France
- Region: Auvergne-Rhône-Alpes
- Department: Ain
- Arrondissement: Belley
- Canton: Lagnieu

Government
  - Mayor (2026–32): Laurent Reymond-Babolat
- Area^{1}: 14.88 km^{2} (5.75 sq mi)
- Elevation: 840 m (2,760 ft)
- Highest elevation: 1,161 m (3,809 ft)
- Lowest elevation: 560 m (1,840 ft)
- Population (2023): 151
  - Density: 10.1/km^{2} (26.3/sq mi)
- Time zone: UTC+01:00 (CET)
  - Summer (DST): UTC+02:00 (CEST)
- INSEE/Postal code: 01280 /01510
- ^{1} French Land Register data, which excludes lakes, ponds, glaciers > 1 km^{2} (0.386 sq mi or 247 acres) and river estuaries.

Ordonnaz is a commune in the Ain department in eastern France.

== Population ==
Historical population
Year	Pop.	±% p.a.
1968	191	—
1975	143	−4.05%
1982	116	−2.95%
1990	115	−0.11%
1999	120	+0.47%
2007	133	+1.29%
2012	153	+2.84%
2017	141	−1.62%
2023	151	+1.15%
Source: INSEE

== See also ==
- Communes of the Ain department
