= Lompnas =

Commune in Auvergne-Rhône-Alpes, France

- Commune
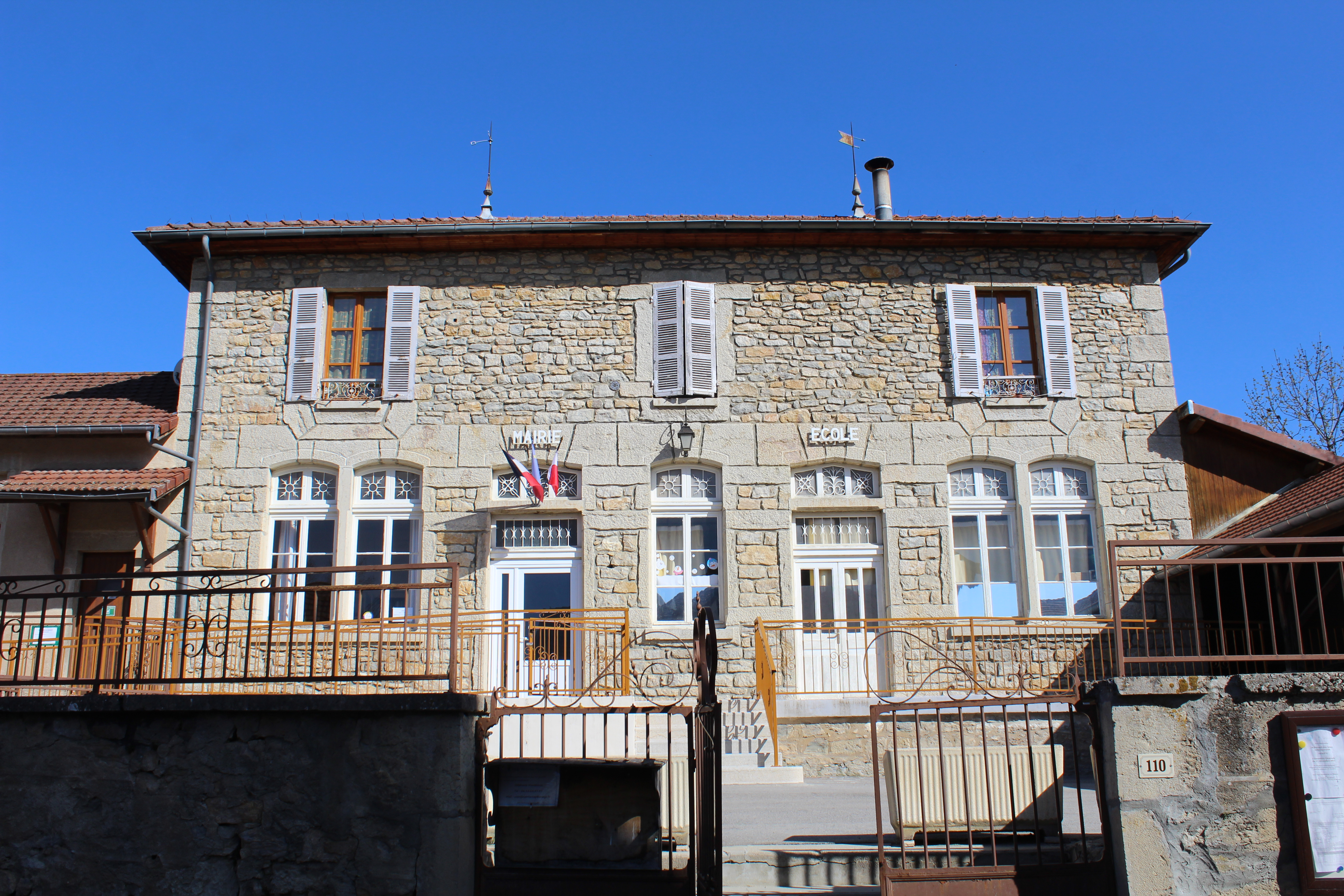
- Town hall
- Location of Lompnas
- Location within France Location within Auvergne-Rhône-Alpes
- Coordinates: 45°48′00″N 5°31′00″E
- Country: France
- Region: Auvergne-Rhône-Alpes
- Department: Ain
- Arrondissement: Belley
- Canton: Lagnieu
- Intercommunality: Plaine de l'Ain

Government
  - Mayor (2026–32): Alexandre Joux
- Area^{1}: 12.69 km^{2} (4.90 sq mi)
- Elevation: 650 m (2,130 ft)
- Highest elevation: 980 m (3,220 ft)
- Lowest elevation: 400 m (1,300 ft)
- Population (2023): 171
  - Density: 13.5/km^{2} (34.9/sq mi)
- Time zone: UTC+01:00 (CET)
  - Summer (DST): UTC+02:00 (CEST)
- INSEE/Postal code: 01219 /01680
- ^{1} French Land Register data, which excludes lakes, ponds, glaciers > 1 km^{2} (0.386 sq mi or 247 acres) and river estuaries.

Lompnas (pronounced [lɔna]; formerly Lompnaz) is a commune in the Ain department in eastern France.

== Population ==
Historical population
Year	Pop.	±% p.a.
1968	150	—
1975	120	−3.14%
1982	126	+0.70%
1990	137	+1.05%
1999	147	+0.79%
2007	165	+1.45%
2012	154	−1.37%
2017	168	+1.76%
2023	171	+0.30%
Source: INSEE

== See also ==
- Communes of the Ain department
