= Marchamp =

Commune in Auvergne-Rhône-Alpes, France

- Commune
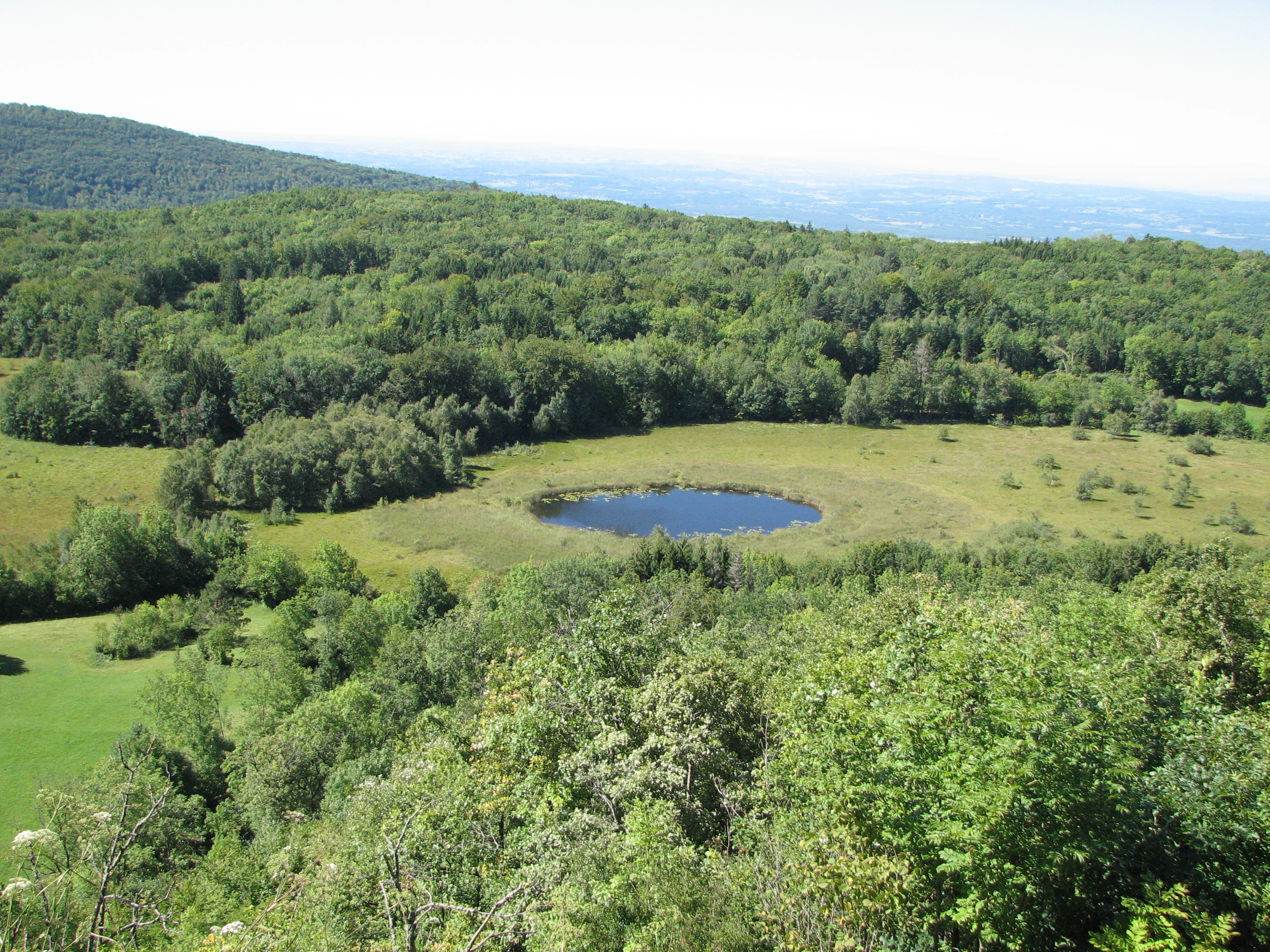
- Cerin Lake
- Location of Marchamp
- Location within France Location within Auvergne-Rhône-Alpes
- Coordinates: 45°47′00″N 5°33′00″E
- Country: France
- Region: Auvergne-Rhône-Alpes
- Department: Ain
- Arrondissement: Belley
- Canton: Lagnieu

Government
  - Mayor (2020–2026): Jean Marcelli
- Area^{1}: 13.11 km^{2} (5.06 sq mi)
- Elevation: 594 m (1,949 ft)
- Highest elevation: 940 m (3,080 ft)
- Lowest elevation: 400 m (1,300 ft)
- Population (2023): 137
  - Density: 10.5/km^{2} (27.1/sq mi)
- Time zone: UTC+01:00 (CET)
  - Summer (DST): UTC+02:00 (CEST)
- INSEE/Postal code: 01233 /01680
- ^{1} French Land Register data, which excludes lakes, ponds, glaciers > 1 km^{2} (0.386 sq mi or 247 acres) and river estuaries.

Marchamp (French pronunciation: [maʁʃɑ̃]) is a commune in the Ain department in eastern France.

== Population ==
Historical population
Year	Pop.	±% p.a.
1968	145	—
1975	113	−3.50%
1982	106	−0.91%
1990	106	+0.00%
1999	108	+0.21%
2007	112	+0.46%
2012	129	+2.87%
2017	131	+0.31%
2023	137	+0.75%
Source: INSEE

== See also ==
- Communes of the Ain department
