= Bénonces =

Commune in Auvergne-Rhône-Alpes, France

- Commune
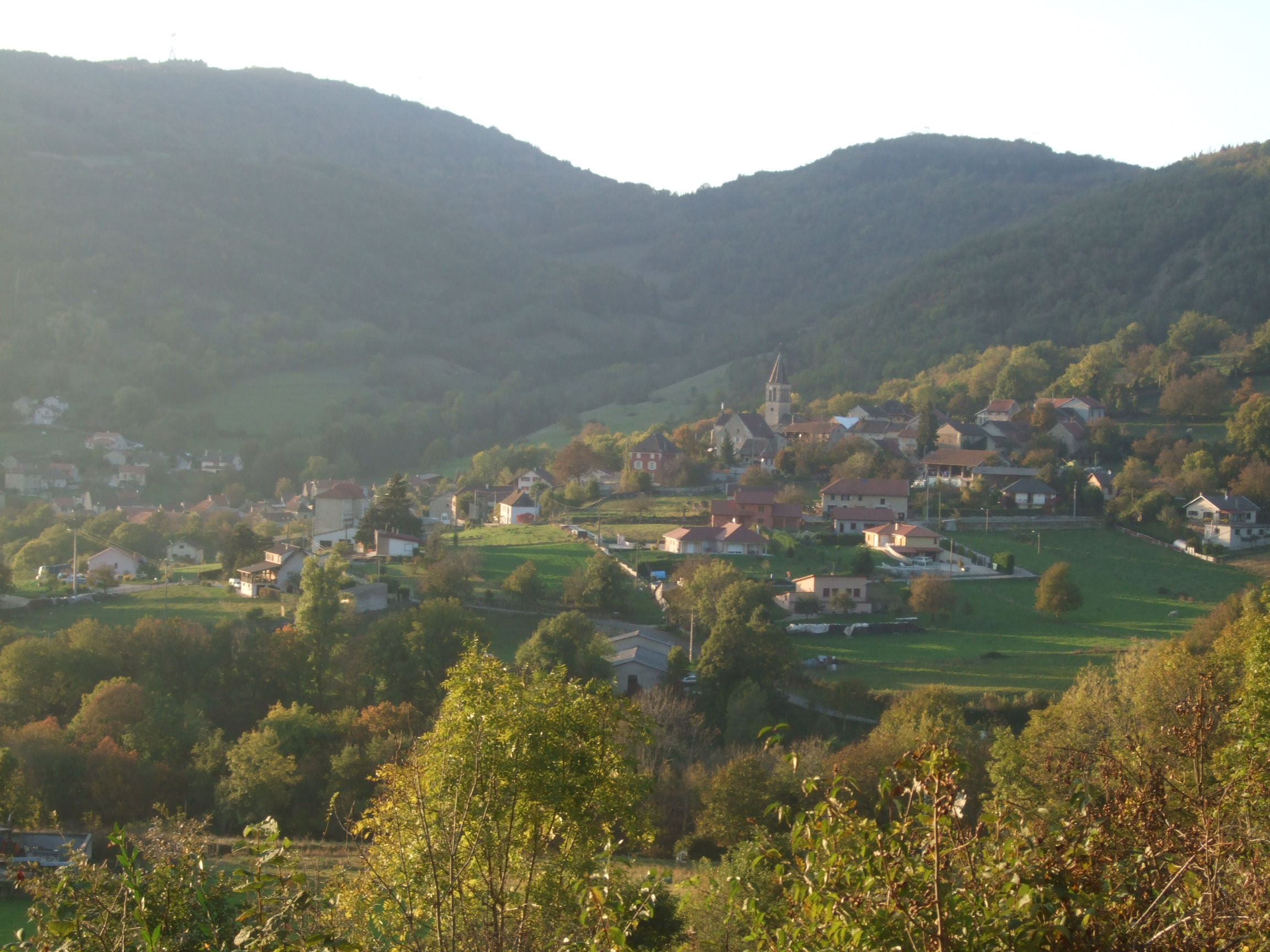
- Location of Bénonces
- Location within France Location within Auvergne-Rhône-Alpes
- Coordinates: 45°50′00″N 5°29′00″E
- Country: France
- Region: Auvergne-Rhône-Alpes
- Department: Ain
- Arrondissement: Belley
- Canton: Lagnieu
- Intercommunality: La Plaine de l'Ain

Government
  - Mayor (2026–32): Frédéric Pellegrin-Romeggio
- Area^{1}: 15.33 km^{2} (5.92 sq mi)
- Elevation: 488 m (1,601 ft)
- Highest elevation: 1,029 m (3,376 ft)
- Lowest elevation: 280 m (920 ft)
- Population (2023): 311
  - Density: 20.3/km^{2} (52.5/sq mi)
- Time zone: UTC+01:00 (CET)
  - Summer (DST): UTC+02:00 (CEST)
- INSEE/Postal code: 01037 /01470
- ^{1} French Land Register data, which excludes lakes, ponds, glaciers > 1 km^{2} (0.386 sq mi or 247 acres) and river estuaries.

Bénonces (French pronunciation: [benɔ̃s]) is a commune in the Ain department in central-eastern France.

== Geography ==
=== Climate ===
Bénonces has an oceanic climate (Köppen climate classification Cfb) closely bordering on a humid continental climate (Dfb). The average annual temperature in Bénonces is 8.2 °C (46.8 °F). The average annual rainfall is 1,723.5 mm (67.85 in) with October as the wettest month. The temperatures are highest on average in July, at around 17.0 °C (62.6 °F), and lowest in January, at around 0.0 °C (32.0 °F). The highest temperature ever recorded in Bénonces was 34.5 °C (94.1 °F) on 13 August 2003; the coldest temperature ever recorded was −24.4 °C (−11.9 °F) on 9 January 1985.

Climate data for Bénonces (1991–2020 averages, extremes 1976−2020)
Month	Jan	Feb	Mar	Apr	May	Jun	Jul	Aug	Sep	Oct	Nov	Dec	Year
Record high °C (°F)	14.0 (57.2)	17.5 (63.5)	21.0 (69.8)	24.5 (76.1)	29.0 (84.2)	32.5 (90.5)	33.5 (92.3)	34.5 (94.1)	29.5 (85.1)	23.5 (74.3)	19.8 (67.6)	15.3 (59.5)	34.5 (94.1)
Mean daily maximum °C (°F)	3.5 (38.3)	4.6 (40.3)	8.7 (47.7)	12.2 (54.0)	16.2 (61.2)	20.1 (68.2)	22.4 (72.3)	22.2 (72.0)	17.6 (63.7)	13.1 (55.6)	7.5 (45.5)	4.1 (39.4)	12.7 (54.9)
Daily mean °C (°F)	0.0 (32.0)	0.5 (32.9)	4.0 (39.2)	7.2 (45.0)	11.1 (52.0)	14.8 (58.6)	17.0 (62.6)	16.9 (62.4)	12.9 (55.2)	9.1 (48.4)	3.9 (39.0)	0.7 (33.3)	8.2 (46.8)
Mean daily minimum °C (°F)	−3.4 (25.9)	−3.6 (25.5)	−0.7 (30.7)	2.1 (35.8)	6.0 (42.8)	9.5 (49.1)	11.5 (52.7)	11.6 (52.9)	8.1 (46.6)	5.0 (41.0)	0.4 (32.7)	−2.6 (27.3)	3.7 (38.7)
Record low °C (°F)	−24.4 (−11.9)	−21.5 (−6.7)	−17.0 (1.4)	−9.1 (15.6)	−3.0 (26.6)	−0.5 (31.1)	3.0 (37.4)	1.4 (34.5)	−1.3 (29.7)	−9.0 (15.8)	−13.0 (8.6)	−19.0 (−2.2)	−24.4 (−11.9)
Average precipitation mm (inches)	158.0 (6.22)	122.1 (4.81)	129.6 (5.10)	126.7 (4.99)	157.5 (6.20)	120.5 (4.74)	112.1 (4.41)	112.1 (4.41)	144.8 (5.70)	176.9 (6.96)	185.6 (7.31)	177.6 (6.99)	1,723.5 (67.85)
Average precipitation days (≥ 1.0 mm)	12.2	11.3	11.1	11.0	13.3	10.3	9.8	9.4	9.8	12.7	12.9	13.9	137.8
Source: Meteociel

== Population ==
Historical population
Year	Pop.	±% p.a.
1968	261	—
1975	258	−0.17%
1982	274	+0.86%
1990	249	−1.19%
1999	243	−0.27%
2007	271	+1.37%
2012	277	+0.44%
2017	298	+1.47%
2023	311	+0.71%
Source: INSEE

== See also ==
- Communes of the Ain department
