= Canton of Seyssel, Ain =

Coordinates: 45°58′N 5°50′E

Seyssel
- Former canton
- Interactive map of Seyssel
- Country: France
- Region: Auvergne-Rhône-Alpes
- Department: Ain
- No. of communes: {{{nbcomm}}}
- Disbanded: 2015
- Area: 100.71 km^{2} (38.88 sq mi)
- Population (2012): 6,798
  - Density: 67.50/km^{2} (174.8/sq mi)

The canton of Seyssel is a former administrative division in eastern France. It was disbanded following the French canton reorganisation which came into effect in March 2015. It had 6,798 inhabitants (2012).

The canton comprised 5 communes:

- Anglefort
- Chanay
- Corbonod
- Culoz
- Seyssel

== Demographics ==
Historical population Canton of Seyssel, Ain
Year	1962	1968	1975	1982	1990	1999
Pop.	5,099	5,358	5,611	5,440	5,394	5,663
±%	—	+5.1%	+4.7%	−3.0%	−0.8%	+5.0%
From the year 1962 on: No double counting – residents of multiple communes (e.g. students and military personnel) are counted only once. Source: INSEE

== See also ==
- Cantons of the Ain department
