= Saint-Maurice-de-Gourdans =

Commune in Auvergne-Rhône-Alpes, France

- Commune
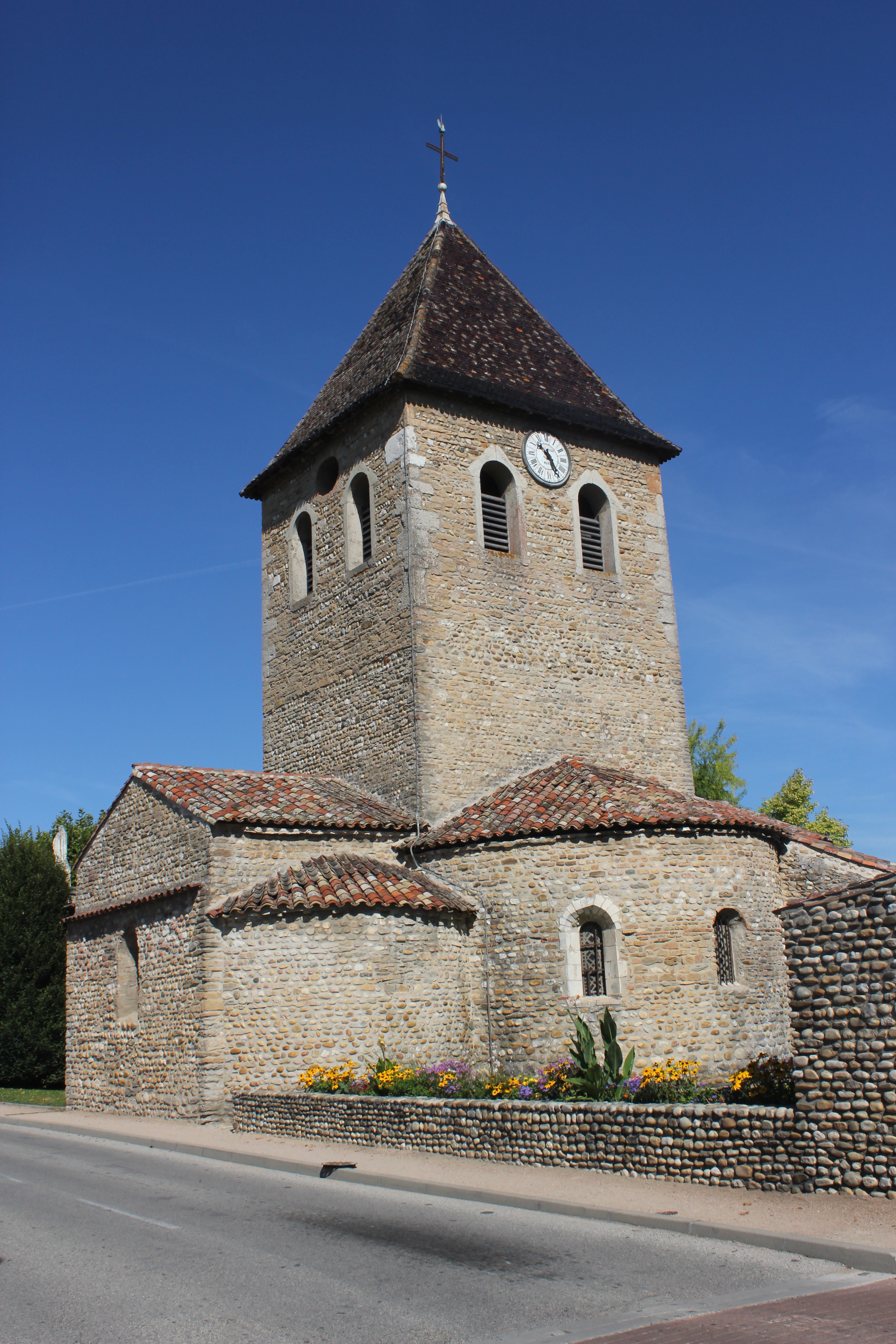

- Coat of arms
- Location of Saint-Maurice-de-Gourdans
- Location within France Location within Auvergne-Rhône-Alpes
- Coordinates: 45°49′00″N 5°12′00″E
- Country: France
- Region: Auvergne-Rhône-Alpes
- Department: Ain
- Arrondissement: Belley
- Canton: Lagnieu
- Intercommunality: Plaine de l'Ain

Government
  - Mayor (2026–32): Yves Vençon
- Area^{1}: 25.4 km^{2} (9.8 sq mi)
- Elevation: 204 m (669 ft)
- Highest elevation: 244 m (801 ft)
- Lowest elevation: 182 m (597 ft)
- Population (2023): 2,903
  - Density: 114/km^{2} (296/sq mi)
- Time zone: UTC+01:00 (CET)
  - Summer (DST): UTC+02:00 (CEST)
- INSEE/Postal code: 01378 /01800
- ^{1} French Land Register data, which excludes lakes, ponds, glaciers > 1 km^{2} (0.386 sq mi or 247 acres) and river estuaries.

Saint-Maurice-de-Gourdans (French pronunciation: [sɛ̃ mɔʁis də ɡuʁdɑ̃]) is a commune in the Ain department in eastern France.

== Population ==
Historical population

Year	Pop.	±% p.a.
1793	1,019	—
1800	898	−1.79%
1806	951	+0.96%
1821	1,032	+0.55%
1831	1,144	+1.04%
1836	1,174	+0.52%
1841	1,127	−0.81%
1846	1,187	+1.04%
1851	1,189	+0.03%
1856	1,197	+0.13%
1861	1,188	−0.15%
1866	1,205	+0.28%
1872	1,114	−1.30%
1876	1,149	+0.78%
1881	1,113	−0.63%
1886	1,135	+0.39%
1891	1,066	−1.25%
1896	1,065	−0.02%
1901	1,019	−0.88%

Year	Pop.	±% p.a.
1906	914	−2.15%
1911	854	−1.35%
1921	770	−1.03%
1926	740	−0.79%
1931	737	−0.08%
1936	720	−0.47%
1946	707	−0.18%
1954	683	−0.43%
1962	683	+0.00%
1968	688	+0.12%
1975	994	+5.40%
1982	1,157	+2.19%
1990	1,575	+3.93%
1999	1,949	+2.40%
2007	2,354	+2.39%
2012	2,472	+0.98%
2017	2,572	+0.80%
2023	2,903	+2.04%

Source: EHESS and INSEE (1968-2023)

== See also ==
- Communes of the Ain department
