= Innimond =

Commune in Auvergne-Rhône-Alpes, France

- Commune
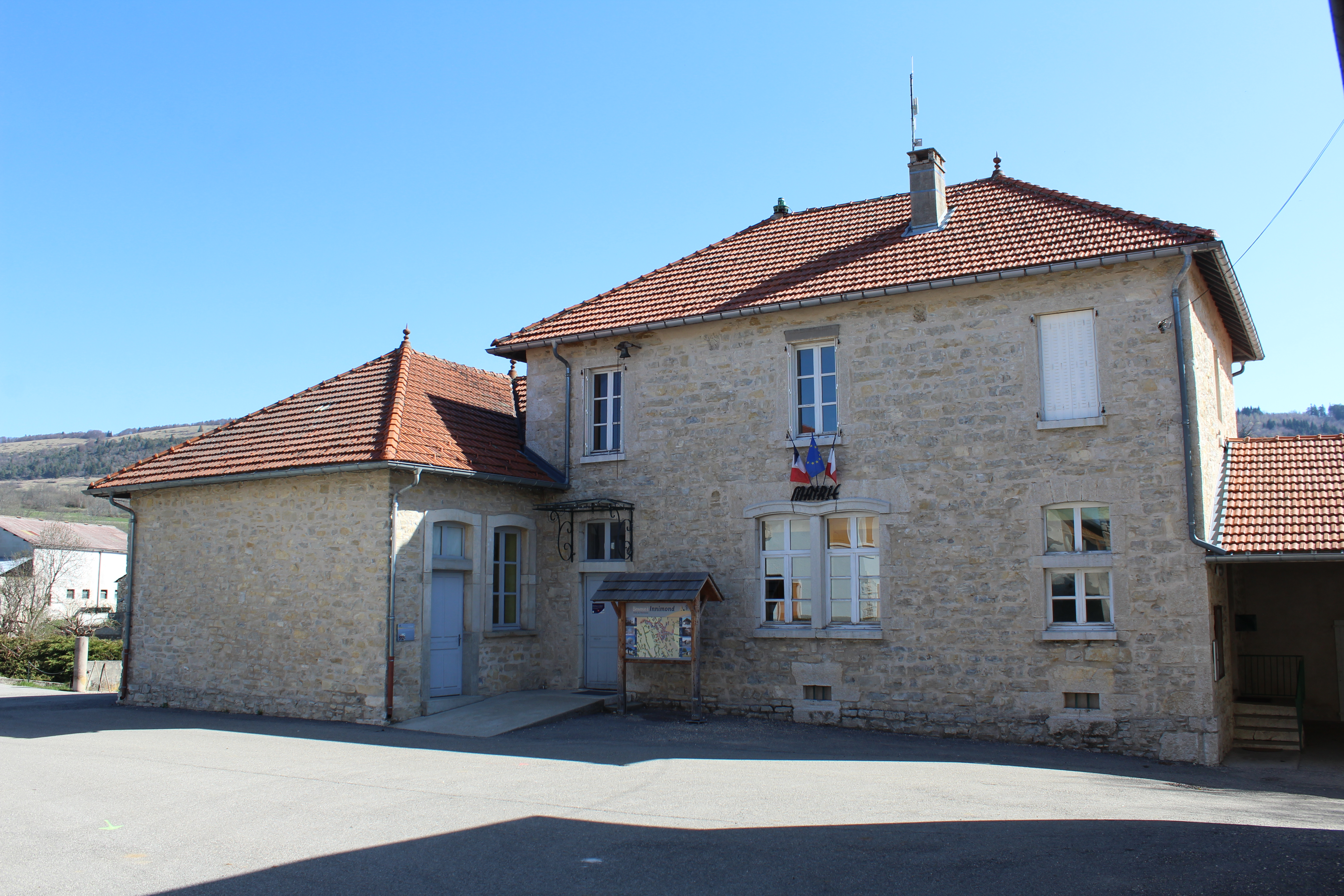
- Town hall
- Location of Innimond
- Location within France Location within Auvergne-Rhône-Alpes
- Coordinates: 45°46′58″N 5°34′20″E
- Country: France
- Region: Auvergne-Rhône-Alpes
- Department: Ain
- Arrondissement: Belley
- Canton: Lagnieu

Government
  - Mayor (2026–32): Serge Gardien
- Area^{1}: 13.44 km^{2} (5.19 sq mi)
- Elevation: 900 m (3,000 ft)
- Highest elevation: 1,218 m (3,996 ft)
- Lowest elevation: 811 m (2,661 ft)
- Population (2023): 95
  - Density: 7.1/km^{2} (18/sq mi)
- Time zone: UTC+01:00 (CET)
  - Summer (DST): UTC+02:00 (CEST)
- INSEE/Postal code: 01190 /01680
- ^{1} French Land Register data, which excludes lakes, ponds, glaciers > 1 km^{2} (0.386 sq mi or 247 acres) and river estuaries.

Innimond (French pronunciation: [inimɔ̃]) is a commune in the Ain department in eastern France.

== Population ==
Historical population
Year	Pop.	±% p.a.
1968	143	—
1975	98	−5.26%
1982	82	−2.51%
1990	81	−0.15%
1999	95	+1.79%
2007	110	+1.85%
2012	117	+1.24%
2017	89	−5.32%
2023	95	+1.09%
Source: INSEE

== See also ==
- Communes of the Ain department
