= Serrières-de-Briord =

Commune in Auvergne-Rhône-Alpes, France

- Commune
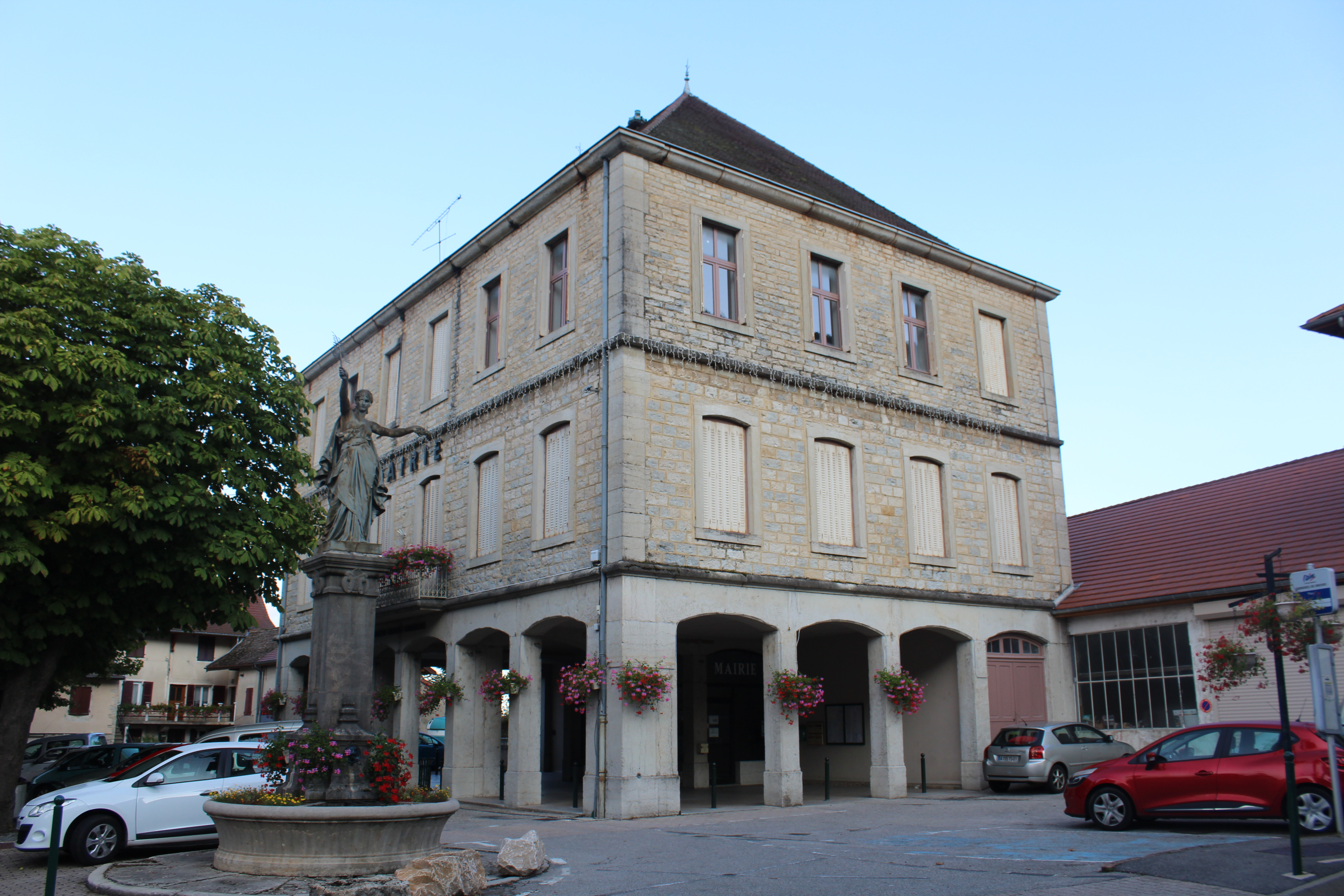
- Town hall
- Location of Serrières-de-Briord
- Location within France Location within Auvergne-Rhône-Alpes
- Coordinates: 45°48′31″N 5°27′18″E
- Country: France
- Region: Auvergne-Rhône-Alpes
- Department: Ain
- Arrondissement: Belley
- Canton: Lagnieu

Government
  - Mayor (2026–32): Pascale Drevet Versaud
- Area^{1}: 8.03 km^{2} (3.10 sq mi)
- Highest elevation: 621 m (2,037 ft)
- Lowest elevation: 200 m (660 ft)
- Population (2023): 1,317
  - Density: 164/km^{2} (425/sq mi)
- Time zone: UTC+01:00 (CET)
  - Summer (DST): UTC+02:00 (CEST)
- INSEE/Postal code: 01403 /01470
- ^{1} French Land Register data, which excludes lakes, ponds, glaciers > 1 km^{2} (0.386 sq mi or 247 acres) and river estuaries.

Serrières-de-Briord is a commune in the Ain department in eastern France.

== Population ==
Historical population
Year	Pop.	±% p.a.
1968	773	—
1975	824	+0.92%
1982	825	+0.02%
1990	834	+0.14%
1999	960	+1.58%
2007	1,083	+1.52%
2012	1,302	+3.75%
2017	1,264	−0.59%
2023	1,317	+0.69%
Source: INSEE

== See also ==
- Communes of the Ain department
