= Seillonnaz =

Commune in Auvergne-Rhône-Alpes, France

- Commune
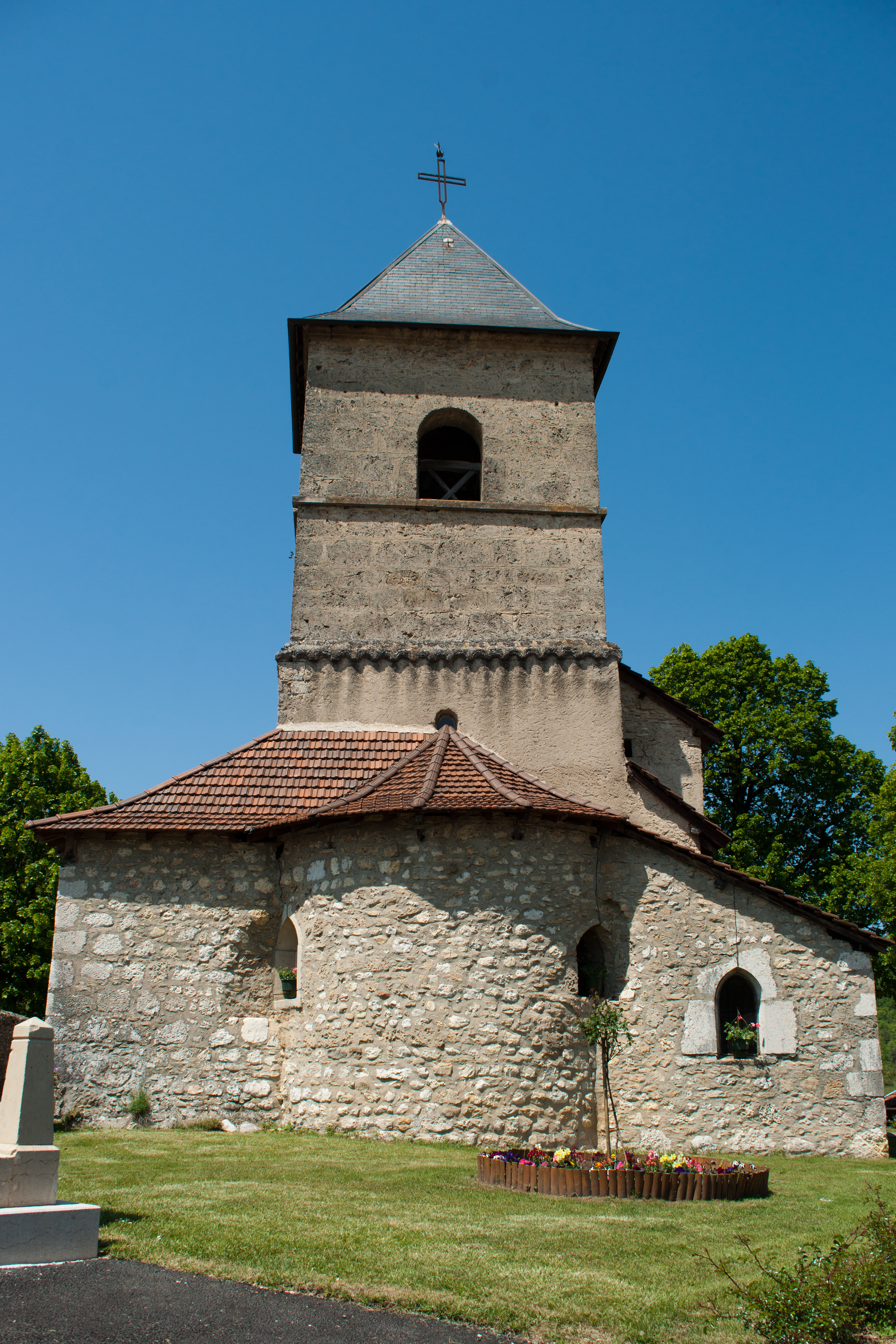
- Location of Seillonnaz
- Location within France Location within Auvergne-Rhône-Alpes
- Coordinates: 45°48′00″N 5°29′00″E
- Country: France
- Region: Auvergne-Rhône-Alpes
- Department: Ain
- Arrondissement: Belley
- Canton: Lagnieu

Government
  - Mayor (2026–32): Pascal Vettard
- Area^{1}: 9.59 km^{2} (3.70 sq mi)
- Elevation: 540 m (1,770 ft)
- Highest elevation: 724 m (2,375 ft)
- Lowest elevation: 275 m (902 ft)
- Population (2023): 134
  - Density: 14.0/km^{2} (36.2/sq mi)
- Time zone: UTC+01:00 (CET)
  - Summer (DST): UTC+02:00 (CEST)
- INSEE/Postal code: 01400 /01470
- ^{1} French Land Register data, which excludes lakes, ponds, glaciers > 1 km^{2} (0.386 sq mi or 247 acres) and river estuaries.

Seillonnaz is a commune in the Ain department in eastern France.

== Population ==
Historical population
Year	Pop.	±% p.a.
1968	123	—
1975	108	−1.84%
1982	120	+1.52%
1990	120	+0.00%
1999	123	+0.27%
2007	143	+1.90%
2012	141	−0.28%
2017	137	−0.57%
2023	134	−0.37%
Source: INSEE

== See also ==
- Communes of the Ain department
