= Saint-Vulbas =

Commune in Auvergne-Rhône-Alpes, France

- Commune
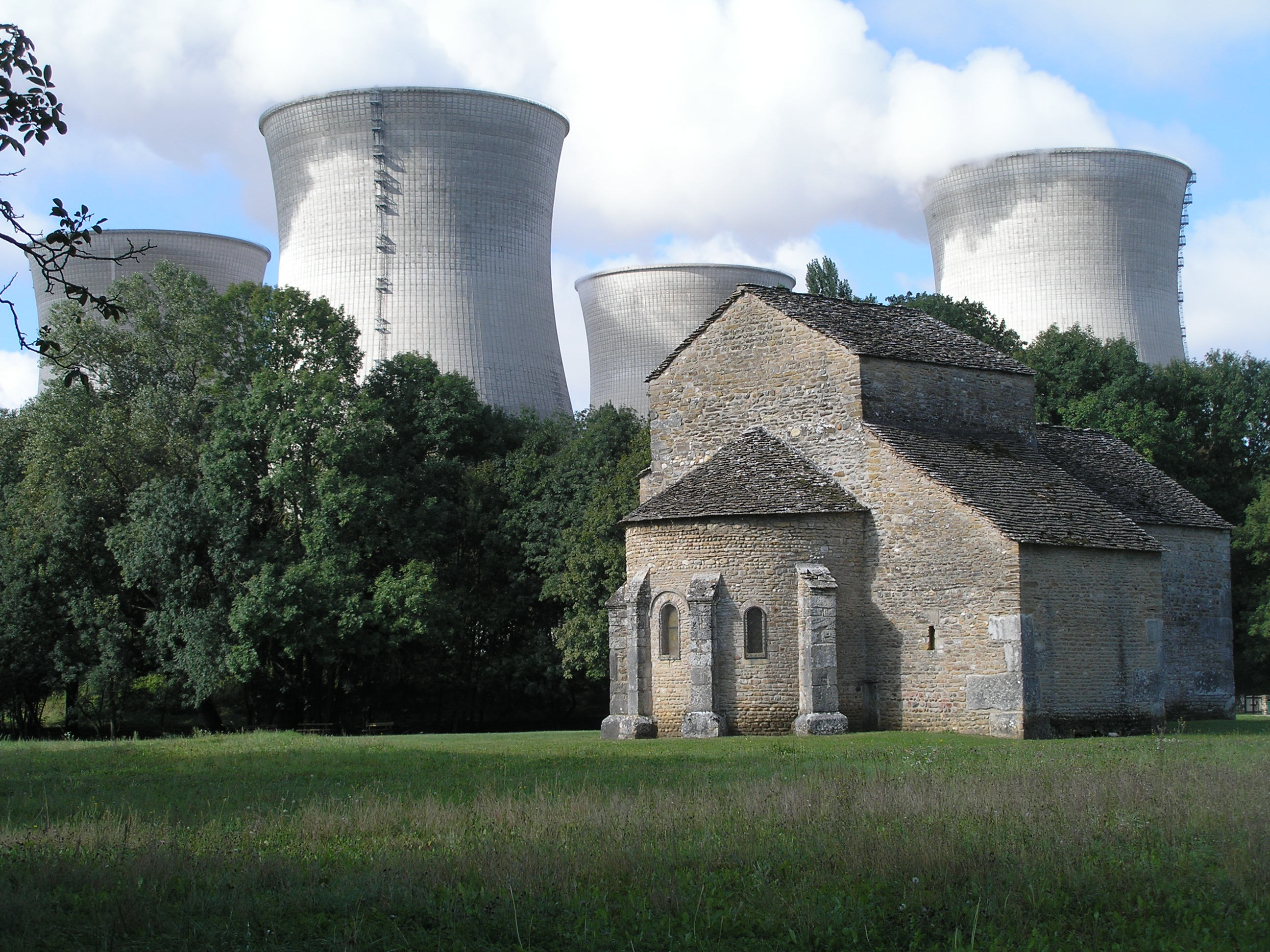
- Chapel of Marcilleux

- Coat of arms
- Location of Saint-Vulbas
- Location within France Location within Auvergne-Rhône-Alpes
- Coordinates: 45°50′00″N 5°17′00″E
- Country: France
- Region: Auvergne-Rhône-Alpes
- Department: Ain
- Arrondissement: Belley
- Canton: Lagnieu
- Intercommunality: Plaine de l'Ain

Government
  - Mayor (2026–32): Marcel Jacquin
- Area^{1}: 21.44 km^{2} (8.28 sq mi)
- Elevation: 207 m (679 ft)
- Highest elevation: 227 m (745 ft)
- Lowest elevation: 192 m (630 ft)
- Population (2023): 1,247
  - Density: 58.16/km^{2} (150.6/sq mi)
- Time zone: UTC+01:00 (CET)
  - Summer (DST): UTC+02:00 (CEST)
- INSEE/Postal code: 01390 /01150
- ^{1} French Land Register data, which excludes lakes, ponds, glaciers > 1 km^{2} (0.386 sq mi or 247 acres) and river estuaries.

Saint-Vulbas (French pronunciation: [sɛ̃ vylba]) is a commune in the Ain department in eastern France.

== Population ==
Historical population
Year	Pop.	±% p.a.
1968	370	—
1975	975	+14.85%
1982	464	−10.06%
1990	710	+5.46%
1999	804	+1.39%
2007	897	+1.38%
2012	1,011	+2.42%
2017	1,286	+4.93%
2023	1,247	−0.51%
Source: INSEE

== Geography ==
The town is located on the right bank of the Rhône, 205 meters above sea level, 35 kilometers northeast of Lyon, 13 kilometers from Ambérieu-en-Bugey . On its territory is the Bugey nuclear power plant as well as the Plaine de l'Ain industrial park .

The town is located in the small region of the Ain plain, between Bas-Bugey and Côtière .

== See also ==
- Communes of the Ain department
