= Chazey-sur-Ain =

Commune in Auvergne-Rhône-Alpes, France

- Commune
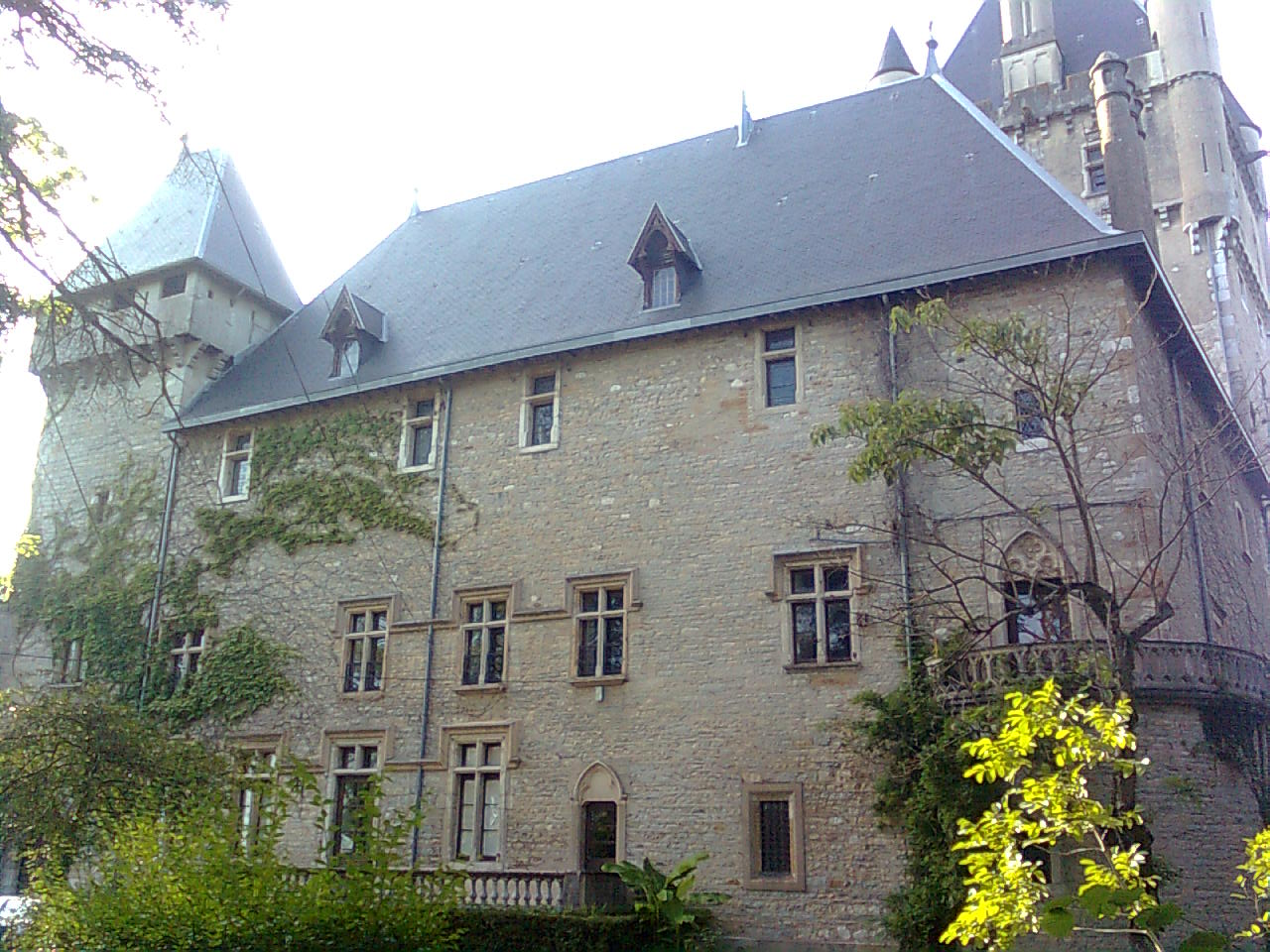
- Chateau

- Coat of arms
- Location of Chazey-sur-Ain
- Location within France Location within Auvergne-Rhône-Alpes
- Coordinates: 45°53′36″N 5°15′21″E
- Country: France
- Region: Auvergne-Rhône-Alpes
- Department: Ain
- Arrondissement: Belley
- Canton: Lagnieu
- Intercommunality: Plaine de l'Ain

Government
  - Mayor (2026–32): Claire André
- Area^{1}: 21.95 km^{2} (8.47 sq mi)
- Elevation: 230 m (750 ft)
- Highest elevation: 261 m (856 ft)
- Lowest elevation: 202 m (663 ft)
- Population (2023): 1,632
  - Density: 74.35/km^{2} (192.6/sq mi)
- Time zone: UTC+01:00 (CET)
  - Summer (DST): UTC+02:00 (CEST)
- INSEE/Postal code: 01099 /01150
- ^{1} French Land Register data, which excludes lakes, ponds, glaciers > 1 km^{2} (0.386 sq mi or 247 acres) and river estuaries.

Chazey-sur-Ain (French pronunciation: [ʃazɛ syʁ ɛ̃], literally Chazey on Ain) is a commune in the Ain department in eastern France.

== Population ==
Historical population
Year	Pop.	±% p.a.
1968	539	—
1975	651	+2.73%
1982	695	+0.94%
1990	895	+3.21%
1999	1,200	+3.31%
2007	1,348	+1.46%
2012	1,555	+2.90%
2017	1,514	−0.53%
2023	1,632	+1.26%
Source: INSEE

== See also ==
- Communes of the Ain department
