= Lhuis =

Commune in Auvergne-Rhône-Alpes, France

- Commune
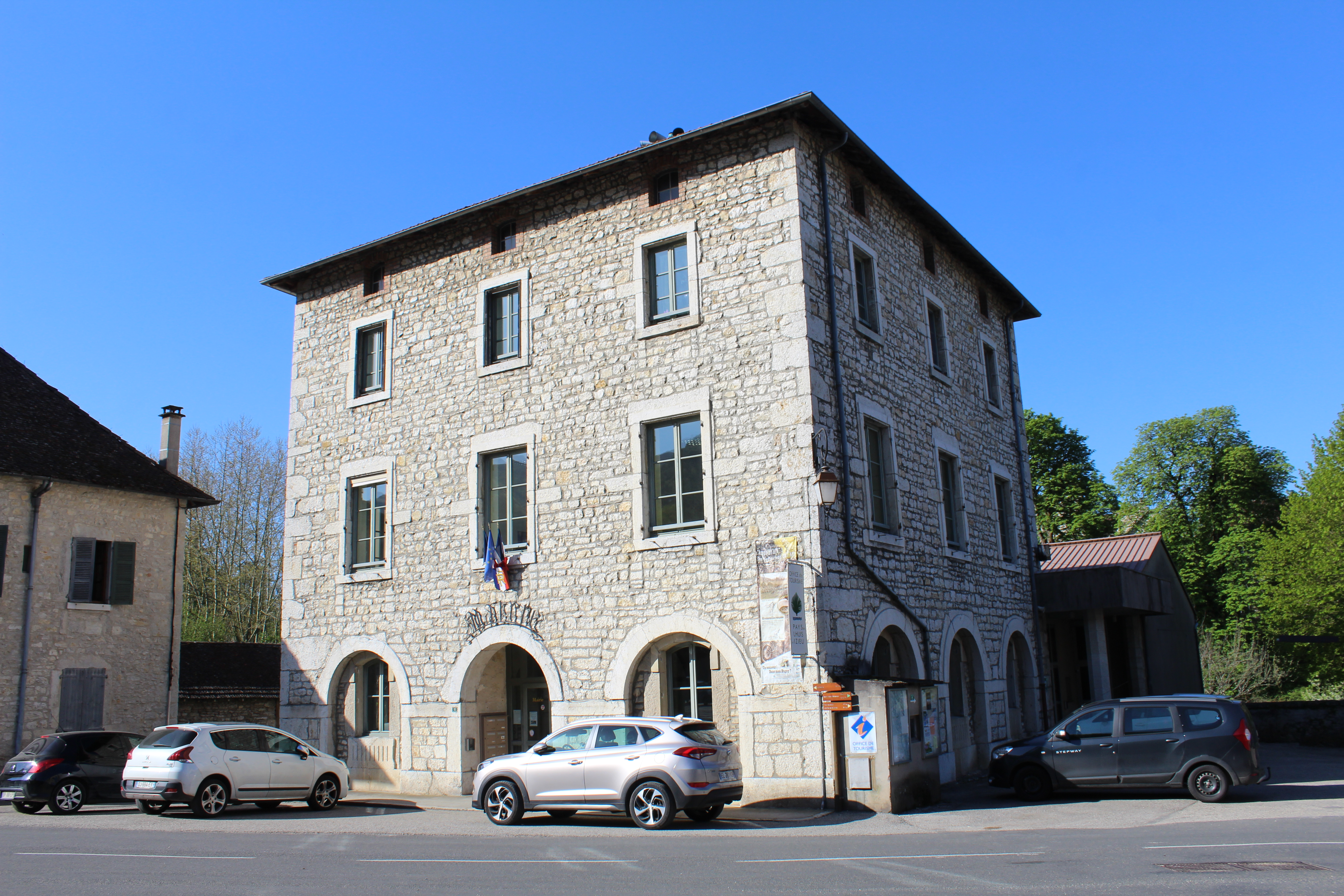
- Town hall

- Coat of arms
- Location of Lhuis
- Location within France Location within Auvergne-Rhône-Alpes
- Coordinates: 45°45′00″N 5°32′00″E
- Country: France
- Region: Auvergne-Rhône-Alpes
- Department: Ain
- Arrondissement: Belley
- Canton: Lagnieu

Government
  - Mayor (2026–32): Emmanuel Ginet
- Area^{1}: 24.43 km^{2} (9.43 sq mi)
- Elevation: 395 m (1,296 ft)
- Highest elevation: 1,020 m (3,350 ft)
- Lowest elevation: 201 m (659 ft)
- Population (2023): 886
  - Density: 36.3/km^{2} (93.9/sq mi)
- Time zone: UTC+01:00 (CET)
  - Summer (DST): UTC+02:00 (CEST)
- INSEE/Postal code: 01216 /01680
- ^{1} French Land Register data, which excludes lakes, ponds, glaciers > 1 km^{2} (0.386 sq mi or 247 acres) and river estuaries.

Lhuis (French pronunciation: [lɥi]) is a commune in the Ain department in eastern France in the Bugey region at the southern end of the Jura Mountains, between Lyon and Aix-les-Bains, about 60 km (37 mi) from each.

== Population ==
Historical population
Year	Pop.	±% p.a.
1968	597	—
1975	592	−0.12%
1982	640	+1.12%
1990	587	−1.07%
1999	724	+2.36%
2007	809	+1.40%
2012	873	+1.53%
2017	889	+0.36%
2023	886	−0.06%
Source: INSEE

== See also ==
- Communes of the Ain department
