= Montagnieu, Ain =

Commune in Auvergne-Rhône-Alpes, France

Montagnieu
- Commune
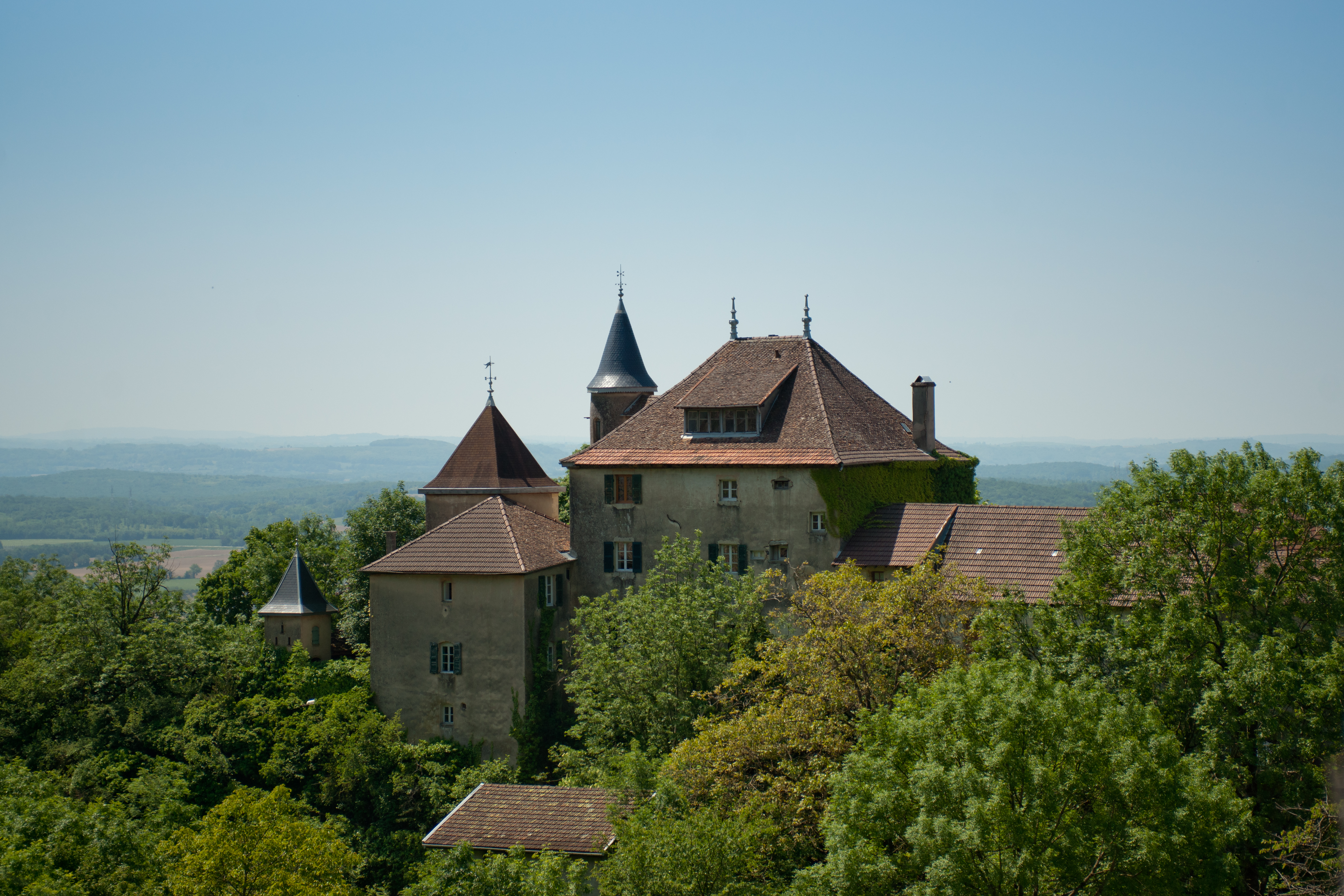
- Chateau
- Location of Montagnieu
- Location within France Location within Auvergne-Rhône-Alpes
- Coordinates: 45°47′41″N 5°28′05″E
- Country: France
- Region: Auvergne-Rhône-Alpes
- Department: Ain
- Arrondissement: Belley
- Canton: Lagnieu

Government
  - Mayor (2026–32): Franck Vollat
- Area^{1}: 6.22 km^{2} (2.40 sq mi)
- Elevation: 225 m (738 ft)
- Highest elevation: 714 m (2,343 ft)
- Lowest elevation: 200 m (660 ft)
- Population (2023): 668
  - Density: 107/km^{2} (278/sq mi)
- Time zone: UTC+01:00 (CET)
  - Summer (DST): UTC+02:00 (CEST)
- INSEE/Postal code: 01255 /01470
- ^{1} French Land Register data, which excludes lakes, ponds, glaciers > 1 km^{2} (0.386 sq mi or 247 acres) and river estuaries.

Montagnieu (French pronunciation: [mɔ̃taɲø]) is a commune in the Ain department in eastern France. It is sited on the eastern bank of the river Rhone, which forms the border with the Isere department to the west.

The 18th century parish church is dedicated to Saint Didier.

== Geography ==
=== Climate ===
Montagnieu has an oceanic climate (Köppen climate classification Cfb). The average annual temperature in Montagnieu is 12.4 °C (54.3 °F). The average annual rainfall is 1,099.9 mm (43.30 in) with November as the wettest month. The temperatures are highest on average in August, at around 21.5 °C (70.7 °F), and lowest in January, at around 3.2 °C (37.8 °F). The highest temperature ever recorded in Montagnieu was 40.0 °C (104.0 °F) on 13 August 2003; the coldest temperature ever recorded was −14.7 °C (5.5 °F) on 7 February 2012.

Climate data for Montagnieu (1991–2020 averages, extremes 1994−2012)
Month	Jan	Feb	Mar	Apr	May	Jun	Jul	Aug	Sep	Oct	Nov	Dec	Year
Record high °C (°F)	17.5 (63.5)	20.0 (68.0)	25.0 (77.0)	28.0 (82.4)	33.6 (92.5)	38.0 (100.4)	38.0 (100.4)	40.0 (104.0)	34.0 (93.2)	27.5 (81.5)	24.0 (75.2)	17.5 (63.5)	40.0 (104.0)
Mean daily maximum °C (°F)	6.0 (42.8)	8.2 (46.8)	13.1 (55.6)	16.6 (61.9)	21.4 (70.5)	25.1 (77.2)	27.2 (81.0)	27.2 (81.0)	22.2 (72.0)	17.7 (63.9)	10.7 (51.3)	6.5 (43.7)	16.8 (62.2)
Daily mean °C (°F)	3.2 (37.8)	4.5 (40.1)	8.5 (47.3)	11.6 (52.9)	16.2 (61.2)	19.5 (67.1)	21.4 (70.5)	21.5 (70.7)	17.1 (62.8)	13.5 (56.3)	7.5 (45.5)	3.8 (38.8)	12.4 (54.3)
Mean daily minimum °C (°F)	0.3 (32.5)	0.8 (33.4)	3.9 (39.0)	6.6 (43.9)	10.9 (51.6)	13.9 (57.0)	15.7 (60.3)	15.8 (60.4)	12.1 (53.8)	9.3 (48.7)	4.4 (39.9)	1.2 (34.2)	7.9 (46.2)
Record low °C (°F)	−11.0 (12.2)	−14.7 (5.5)	−11.0 (12.2)	−2.5 (27.5)	1.0 (33.8)	3.0 (37.4)	8.0 (46.4)	5.5 (41.9)	2.0 (35.6)	−3.5 (25.7)	−7.0 (19.4)	−12.3 (9.9)	−14.7 (5.5)
Average precipitation mm (inches)	92.8 (3.65)	72.9 (2.87)	75.4 (2.97)	83.3 (3.28)	98.1 (3.86)	82.5 (3.25)	75.0 (2.95)	78.1 (3.07)	99.0 (3.90)	111.0 (4.37)	122.3 (4.81)	109.5 (4.31)	1,099.9 (43.30)
Average precipitation days (≥ 1.0 mm)	10.0	9.1	9.0	8.6	10.0	8.4	7.1	7.3	7.5	10.1	10.8	11.1	108.9
Source: Meteociel

== Population ==
Historical population
Year	Pop.	±% p.a.
1968	306	—
1975	354	+2.10%
1982	372	+0.71%
1990	356	−0.55%
1999	386	+0.90%
2007	472	+2.55%
2012	537	+2.61%
2017	622	+2.98%
2023	668	+1.20%
Source: INSEE

== See also ==
- Communes of the Ain department
