= Canton of Saint-Rambert-en-Bugey =

Coordinates: 45°56′49″N 5°26′15″E

Saint-Rambert-en-Bugey
- Former canton
- Interactive map of Saint-Rambert-en-Bugey
- Country: France
- Region: Auvergne-Rhône-Alpes
- Department: Ain
- No. of communes: {{{nbcomm}}}
- Disbanded: 2015
- Area: 140.71 km^{2} (54.33 sq mi)
- Population (2012): 5,429
  - Density: 38.58/km^{2} (99.93/sq mi)

The canton of Saint-Rambert-en-Bugey is a former administrative division in eastern France. It was disbanded following the French canton reorganisation which came into effect in March 2015. It had 5,429 inhabitants (2012).

The canton comprised 12 communes:

- Arandas
- Argis
- Chaley
- Cleyzieu
- Conand
- Évosges
- Hostias
- Nivollet-Montgriffon
- Oncieu
- Saint-Rambert-en-Bugey
- Tenay
- Torcieu

== Demographics ==
Historical population Canton of Saint-Rambert-en-Bugey
| Year | 1962 | 1968 | 1975 | 1982 | 1990 | 1999 |
| Pop. | 6,439 | 6,846 | 5,865 | 5,440 | 5,108 | 4,949 |
| ±% | — | +6.3% | −14.3% | −7.2% | −6.1% | −3.1% |
From the year 1962 on: No double counting – residents of multiple communes (e.g. students and military personnel) are counted only once. Source: INSEE

== See also ==
- Cantons of the Ain department
