= Ambutrix =

Commune in Auvergne-Rhône-Alpes, France

- Commune
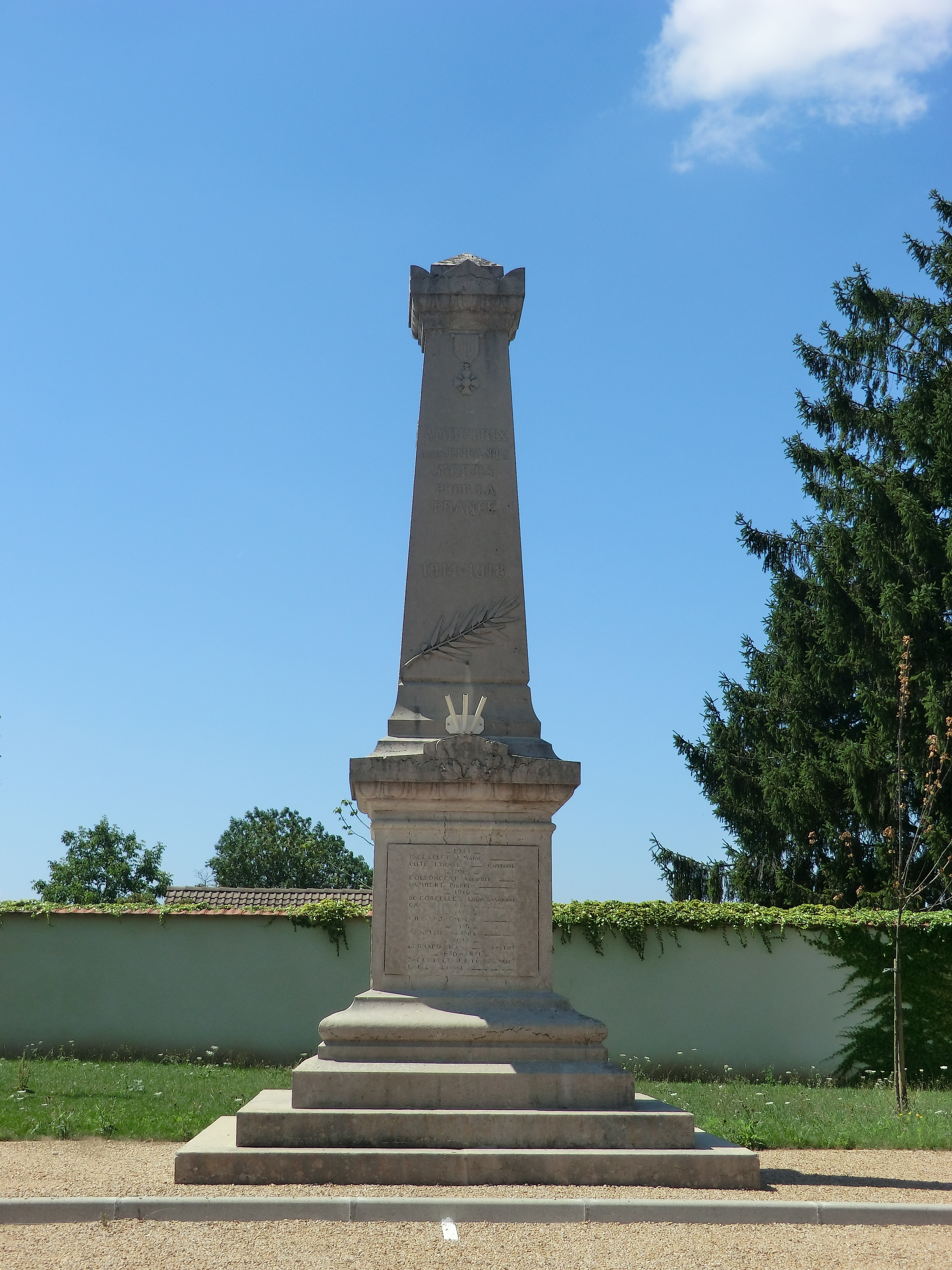
- War Memorial at Ambutrix

- Coat of arms
- Location of Ambutrix
- Location within France Location within Auvergne-Rhône-Alpes
- Coordinates: 45°56′23″N 5°20′20″E
- Country: France
- Region: Auvergne-Rhône-Alpes
- Department: Ain
- Arrondissement: Belley
- Canton: Ambérieu-en-Bugey
- Intercommunality: La Plaine de l'Ain

Government
  - Mayor (2026–32): Dominique Deloffre
- Area^{1}: 5.22 km^{2} (2.02 sq mi)
- Elevation: 254 m (833 ft)
- Highest elevation: 370 m (1,210 ft)
- Lowest elevation: 237 m (778 ft)
- Population (2023): 760
  - Density: 150/km^{2} (380/sq mi)
- Time zone: UTC+01:00 (CET)
  - Summer (DST): UTC+02:00 (CEST)
- INSEE/Postal code: 01008 /01500
- Website: https://www.ambutrix.fr/
- ^{1} French Land Register data, which excludes lakes, ponds, glaciers > 1 km^{2} (0.386 sq mi or 247 acres) and river estuaries.

Ambutrix (French pronunciation: [ɑ̃bytʁiks]) is a commune in the Ain department in the Auvergne-Rhône-Alpes region of eastern France.

The commune covers an area of 5.22 km² (2.02 sq mi). Dominique Deloffre is the mayor for the 2020-2026 tenure.

The inhabitants of the commune are known as Butrians or Butrianes.

== Geography ==
Ambutrix is located some 2 km south-west of Amberieu-en-Bugey and some 40 km north-east of Lyon. It can be accessed by road D1075 from Saint-Denis-en-Bugey in the north which runs south through the heart of the commune and continues past Charveyron. There is also road D408 coming from the west, crossing the D1075 and continuing to the village then south to Vaux-en-Bugey. There are a number of small country roads in the commune. The commune consists mostly of farmland with forest to the west and particularly in the east. A railway runs through the commune from Saint-Denis-en-Bugey to Lagnieu in the south.

Le Buizin stream runs north through the commune and the village to join the Albarine river to the north.

== History ==
The commune takes its name from the presence of Celtic people called Ambarri in the region.

=== Heraldry ===
Arms of Ambutrix	Blazon: Azure, a city gateway Argent open masoned and windowed in Sable posed on a hillock of Gules and surmounted by a Gallic helmet winged the same; debruised by a sword of Argent piercing the gateway.

== Administration ==
List of Successive Mayors of Ambutrix

From	To	Name	Party
1995	2001	Roland Dulot	
2001	2014	Patrick Paccallet	NC
2014	Present	Dominique Deloffre	

== Population ==
Historical population
Year	Pop.	±% p.a.
1968	327	—
1975	353	+1.10%
1982	405	+1.98%
1990	595	+4.93%
1999	586	−0.17%
2007	649	+1.28%
2012	739	+2.63%
2017	752	+0.35%
2023	760	+0.18%
Source: INSEE

== Culture and heritage ==
=== Lordship and Castle of Verneaux ===
- Verneaux Castle: Verneaux Castle was built on the hill overlooking the village. It stood near the castle of Saint Denis en Bugey. It was probably built in the course of the 14th century. It was successively the home of the Vareilles, Rougemont, and finally the Montferrand Valernot families. The last owner of the castle was Victor de Murant. The building was almost completely destroyed during the French Revolution.
- The Lordship of Verneaux: The first lords of Verneaux and the builder of the castle was the House of Vareilles (according to the Samuel Guichenon collection). This family fief brought Ambutrix to the lords of Coligny. This family line ended with Agnes de Vareilles, Lady of Verneaux, who married Jacques de Rougemont in 1402 from the house of Rougemont. Thus began the branch of the lords of Verneaux with names and the coat of arms of Rougemont. In 1437 Galéas de Saleneuve, the Lord of Saint-Denis-de-Chosson (former name of Saint Denis en Bugey) faced some claims from his neighbour, Jacques Rougemont, lord of Verneaux in the parish of Ambutrix dependent on the mandate of Saint-Denis. It vigorously defended its legal rights. In 1468 Philibert de Rougemont, knight, lord of Verneaux, and grandson of Jacques de Rougemont was married. The branch of the lords of Verneaux ended with the death of Hugues de Rougemont in 1620. The possessions of the lordship were sold to Jeanne de Moyria, the widow of Hugh and Pierre de Montferrand - Lords of Château-Gaillard. It was at this time that the manor passed into the hands of the Counts of Savoy. In 1775 the lordship, by the marriage of Louise de Montferrand - the only daughter of Charles de Montferrand - passed to Hugh de Valernod, president and lieutenant-general of the presidium of Valence. Their daughter, Mary de Valernod, married Victor de Murat, the last owner of the manor.

=== Sites and monuments ===
- Baltazar Cross
- Church of Saint Maurice: This church appears for the first time in a charter from 1180. In 1191 Pope Innocent III confirmed the church as the abbey of Saint-Rambert-en-Bugey. It was then an annex of the Church of Vaux-en-Bugey which itself belonged to the diocese of Lyon.

=== Festivals ===
La Vogue is held on the first weekend of September and is organized by the conscripts of the village.

== See also ==
- Communes of the Ain department

=== External links ===
- Community of communes of Plaine de l'Ain website (in French)
- Ambutrix on Géoportail, National Geographic Institute (IGN) website (in French)
- Amburtrix on the 1750 Cassini Map
