= Canton of Ambérieu-en-Bugey =

Coordinates: 45°57′47″N 5°21′15″E

Ambérieu-en-Bugey
- Canton
- Interactive map of Ambérieu-en-Bugey
- Country: France
- Region: Auvergne-Rhône-Alpes
- Department: Ain
- No. of communes: {{{nbcomm}}}

Government
  - Representatives (2021–2028): Joël Brunet; Aurélie Petit
- Area: 218.70 km^{2} (84.44 sq mi)
- Population (2023): 32,286
  - Density: 147.63/km^{2} (382.35/sq mi)
- INSEE code: 01 01

The canton of Ambérieu-en-Bugey is an administrative division of the Ain department, eastern France. Its borders were modified at the French canton reorganisation which came into effect in March 2015. Its seat is located in Ambérieu-en-Bugey. As of January 2021, the population of the canton was 31,035.

== Political representation ==
=== Department councillors since 2015 ===
List of successive departmental councillors for the canton of Ambérieu-en-Bugey since 2015
Electoral period		In office		Councillors	Party	Capacity
2015	2021	2015	2021	Sandrine Castellano	UDI	Adjunct mayor of Ambérieu-en-Bugey
2015	2021	2015	2021	Christophe Fortin	UMP	Lawyer
2021	2028	2021	Incumbent	Joël Brunet	DVD	Mayor of Château-Gaillard
2021	2028	2021	Incumbent	Aurélie Petit	DVD	Adjunct mayor of Ambérieu-en-Bugey

== Composition ==
=== Composition prior to 2015 ===
The canton of Ambérieu-en-Bugey consisted of 8 communes with a population of 22,151 in 2010.

List of communes in the canton of Ambérieu-en-Bugey prior to the cantonal realignment of 2014.
Name	Code INSEE	Postal Code	Area (km^{2})	Population (2012)	Density (per km^{2})
Ambérieu-en-Bugey (Seat)	01004	01500	24.60	14,233	579
L'Abergement-de-Varey	01002	01640	9.15	235	26
Ambronay	01007	01500	33.55	2,437	73
Bettant	01041	01500	3.37	739	219
Château-Gaillard	01089	01500	16.06	1,881	117
Douvres	01149	01500	5.26	993	189
Saint-Denis-en-Bugey	01345	01500	2.61	2,178	834
Saint-Maurice-de-Rémens	01379	01500	10.35	724	70

=== Composition since 2015 ===
The new canton consists of 18 communes in their entirety:

List of 18 communes of the canton of Ambérieu-en-Bugey on 1 January 2021
Name	Code INSEE	Intercommunality	Area (km^{2})	Population (2018)	Density (per km^{2})
Ambérieu-en-Bugey (Seat)	01004	Plaine de l'Ain	24.60	14,204	577
Ambronay	01007	Plaine de l'Ain	33.55	2,763	82
Ambutrix	01008	Plaine de l'Ain	5.22	755	145
Arandas	01013	Plaine de l'Ain	14.10	144	10
Argis	01017	Plaine de l'Ain	7.84	450	57
Bettant	01041	Plaine de l'Ain	3.37	745	221
Château-Gaillard	01089	Plaine de l'Ain	16.06	2,195	137
Cleyzieu	01107	Plaine de l'Ain	7.82	135	17
Conand	01111	Plaine de l'Ain	15.28	128	8.4
Douvres	01149	Plaine de l'Ain	5.26	1,059	201
L'Abergement-de-Varey	01002	Plaine de l'Ain	9.15	253	28
Nivollet-Montgriffon	01277	Plaine de l'Ain	8.24	119	14
Oncieu	01279	Plaine de l'Ain	7.76	84	11
Saint-Denis-en-Bugey	01345	Plaine de l'Ain	2.61	2,288	877
Saint-Maurice-de-Rémens	01379	Plaine de l'Ain	10.35	758	73
Saint-Rambert-en-Bugey	01384	Plaine de l'Ain	28.55	2,228	78
Torcieu	01421	Plaine de l'Ain	10.72	728	68
Vaux-en-Bugey	01431	Plaine de l'Ain	8.22	1,221	149
Canton d'Ambérieu-en-Bugey	01 01		218.70	30,257	138

== Pictures of the canton ==
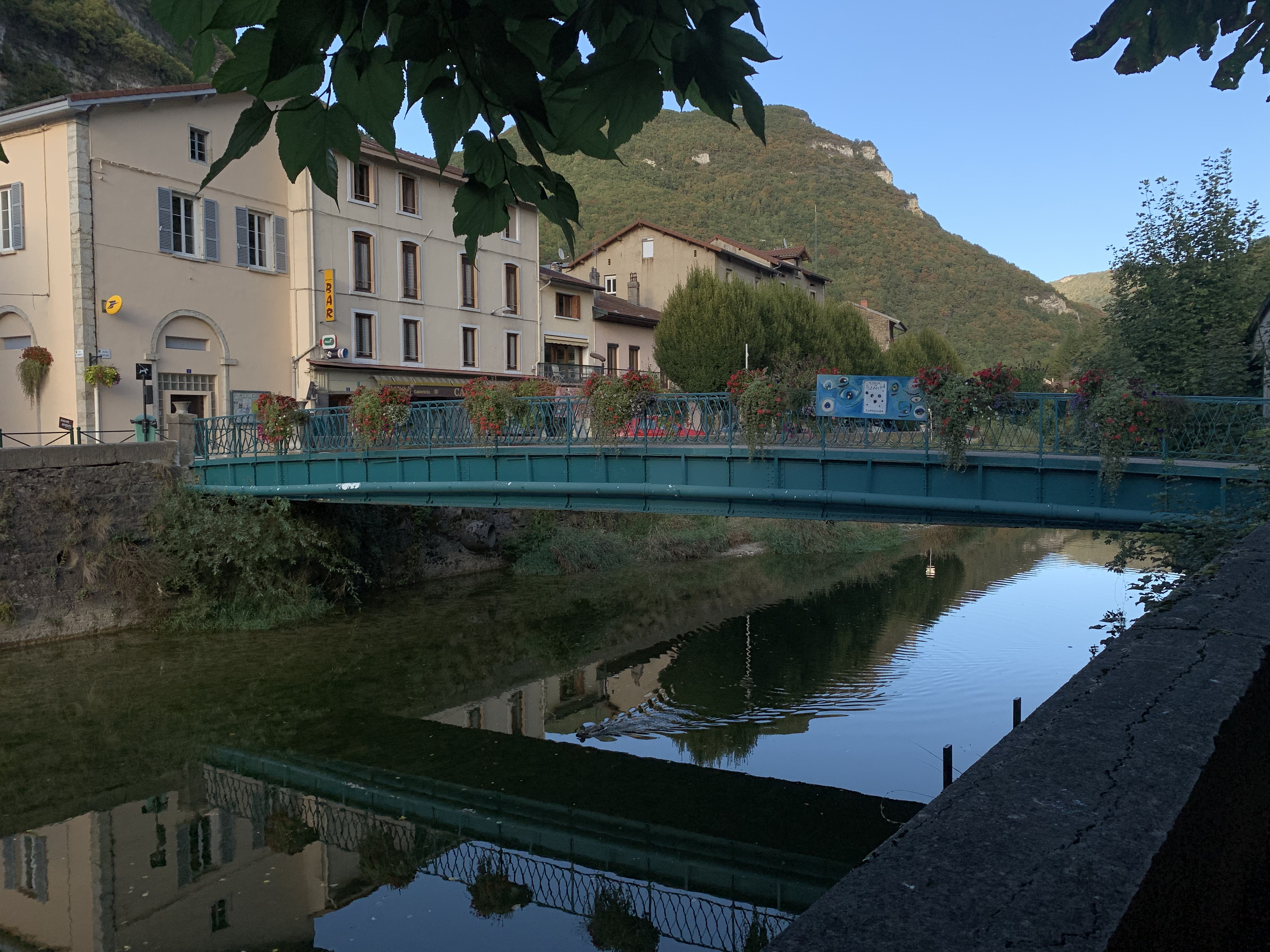
Albarine's river in Saint-Rambert-en-Bugey

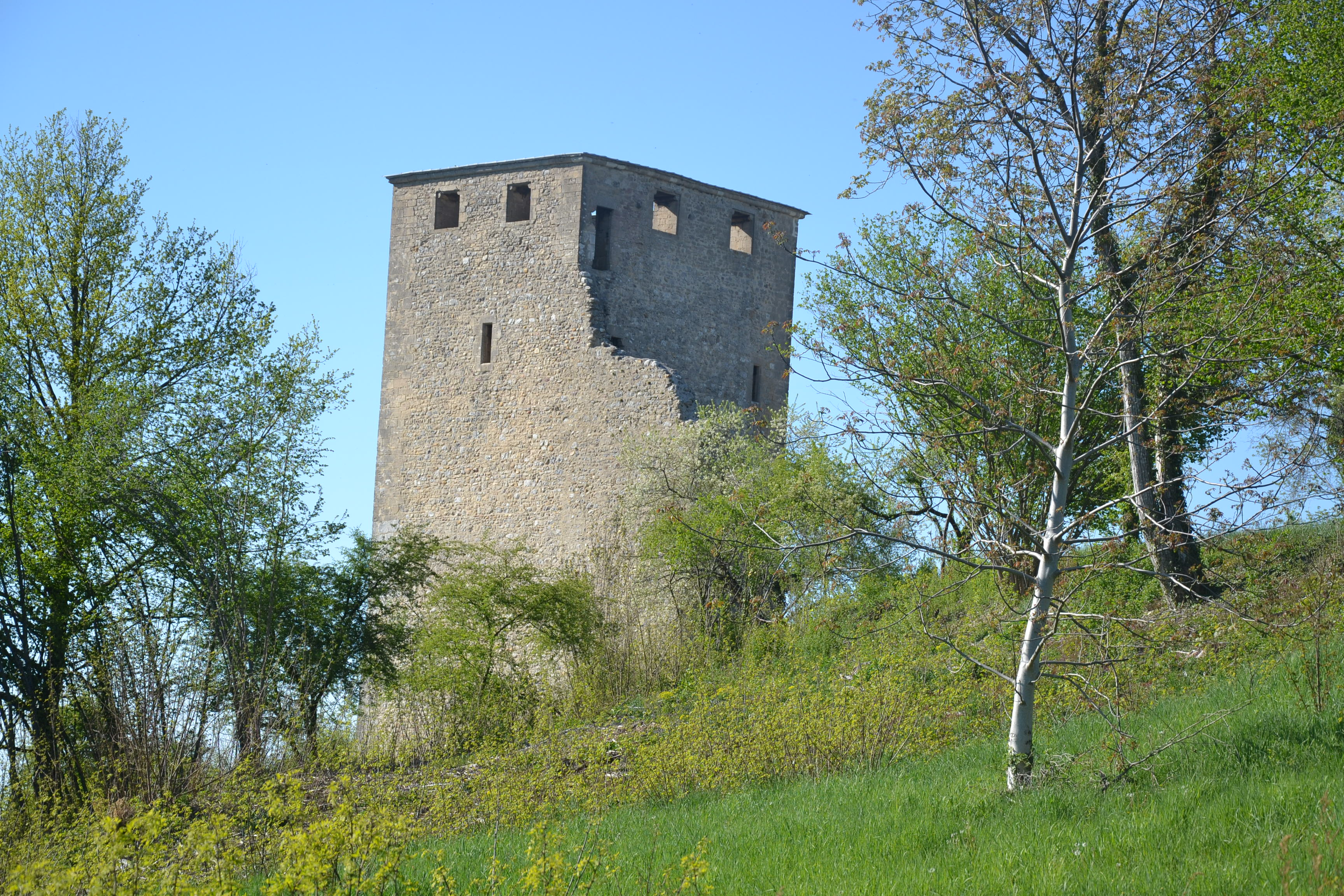
Tower of the Saint-Denis-en-Bugey's castle

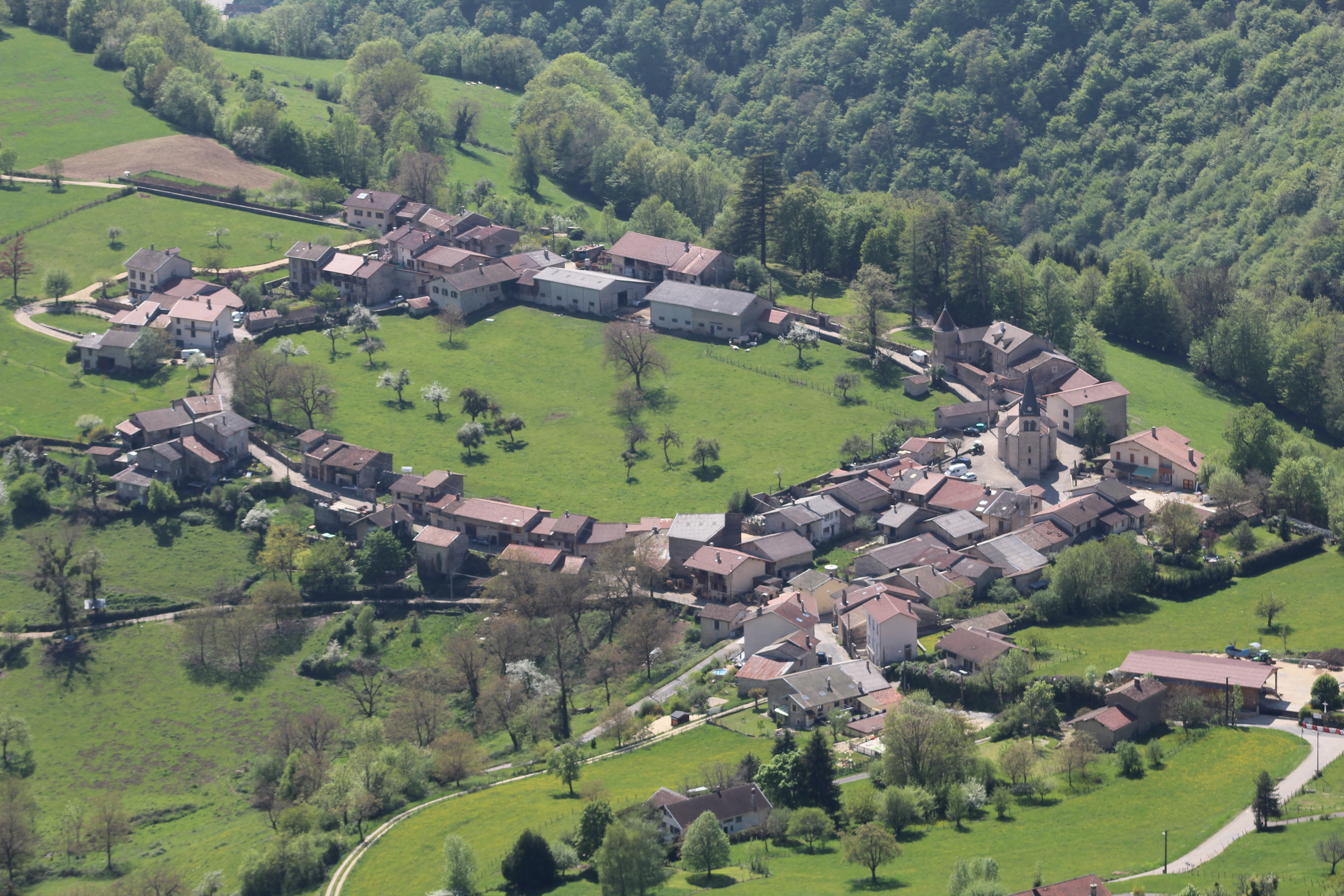
View of Oncieu

== See also ==
- Cantons of the Ain department
- Communes of France
