= L'Abergement-de-Varey =

Commune in Auvergne-Rhône-Alpes, France

- Commune
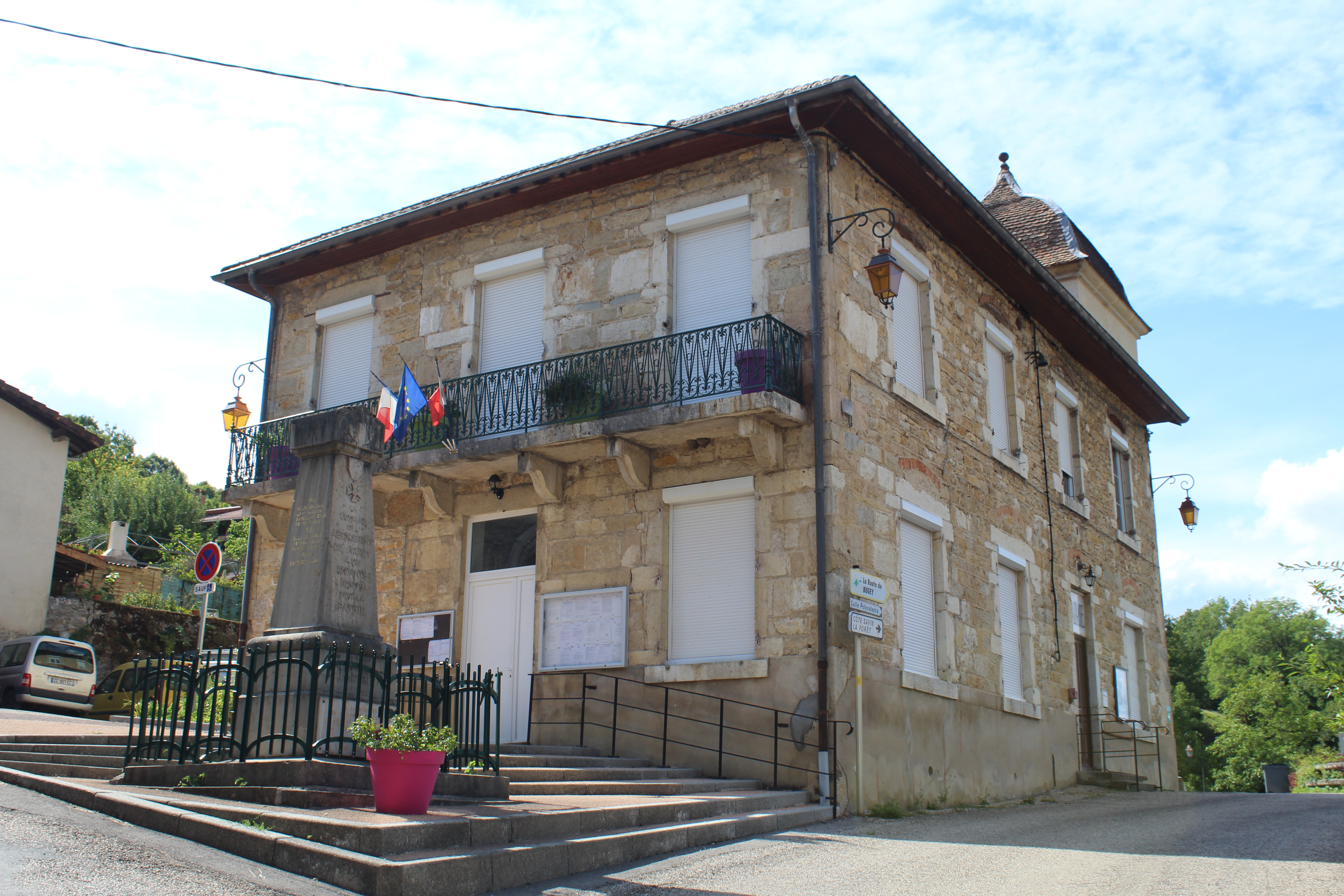
- Town hall

- Coat of arms
- Location of L'Abergement-de-Varey
- Location within France Location within Auvergne-Rhône-Alpes
- Coordinates: 46°00′28″N 5°25′31″E
- Country: France
- Region: Auvergne-Rhône-Alpes
- Department: Ain
- Arrondissement: Belley
- Canton: Ambérieu-en-Bugey
- Intercommunality: Plaine de l'Ain

Government
  - Mayor (2026–32): François Courouble
- Area^{1}: 9.15 km^{2} (3.53 sq mi)
- Elevation: 380 m (1,250 ft)
- Highest elevation: 748 m (2,454 ft)
- Lowest elevation: 290 m (950 ft)
- Population (2023): 270
  - Density: 30/km^{2} (76/sq mi)
- Demonym(s): Abergementais, Abergementaises
- Time zone: UTC+01:00 (CET)
  - Summer (DST): UTC+02:00 (CEST)
- INSEE/Postal code: 01002 /01640
- Website: https://abergement-de-varey.fr/
- ^{1} French Land Register data, which excludes lakes, ponds, glaciers > 1 km^{2} (0.386 sq mi or 247 acres) and river estuaries.

L'Abergement-de-Varey (French pronunciation: [labɛʁʒəmɑ̃ də vaʁɛ]) is a commune in the department of Ain in central-eastern France.

== Geography ==
The commune is located in the first foothills of the Bugey, not far from Pont-d'Ain. Highway 59 crosses the commune, which is situated on a hillside.

== Name ==
There are four communes in Ain, with the name abergement, which is typical of the Jura, and also exists in Saône-et-Loire, Côte-d'Or, and Doubs; the other three are Le Petit-Abergement, Le Grand-Abergement, L'Abergement-Clémenciat. It apparently designated agricultural concessions granted from the 11th to the 15th century.

== Population ==
Historical population
| Year | Pop. | ±% p.a. |
|---|---|---|
| 1968 | 88 | — |
| 1975 | 106 | +2.69% |
| 1982 | 136 | +3.62% |
| 1990 | 159 | +1.97% |
| 1999 | 168 | +0.61% |
| 2007 | 195 | +1.88% |
| 2012 | 235 | +3.80% |
| 2017 | 248 | +1.08% |
| 2023 | 270 | +1.43% |
Source: INSEE

== Sights ==
- Neo-roman church built in the 19th century
- Monument to the Resistance

== See also ==
- Communes of the Ain department
