= Arandas, Ain =

Commune in Auvergne-Rhône-Alpes, France

Arandas
- Commune
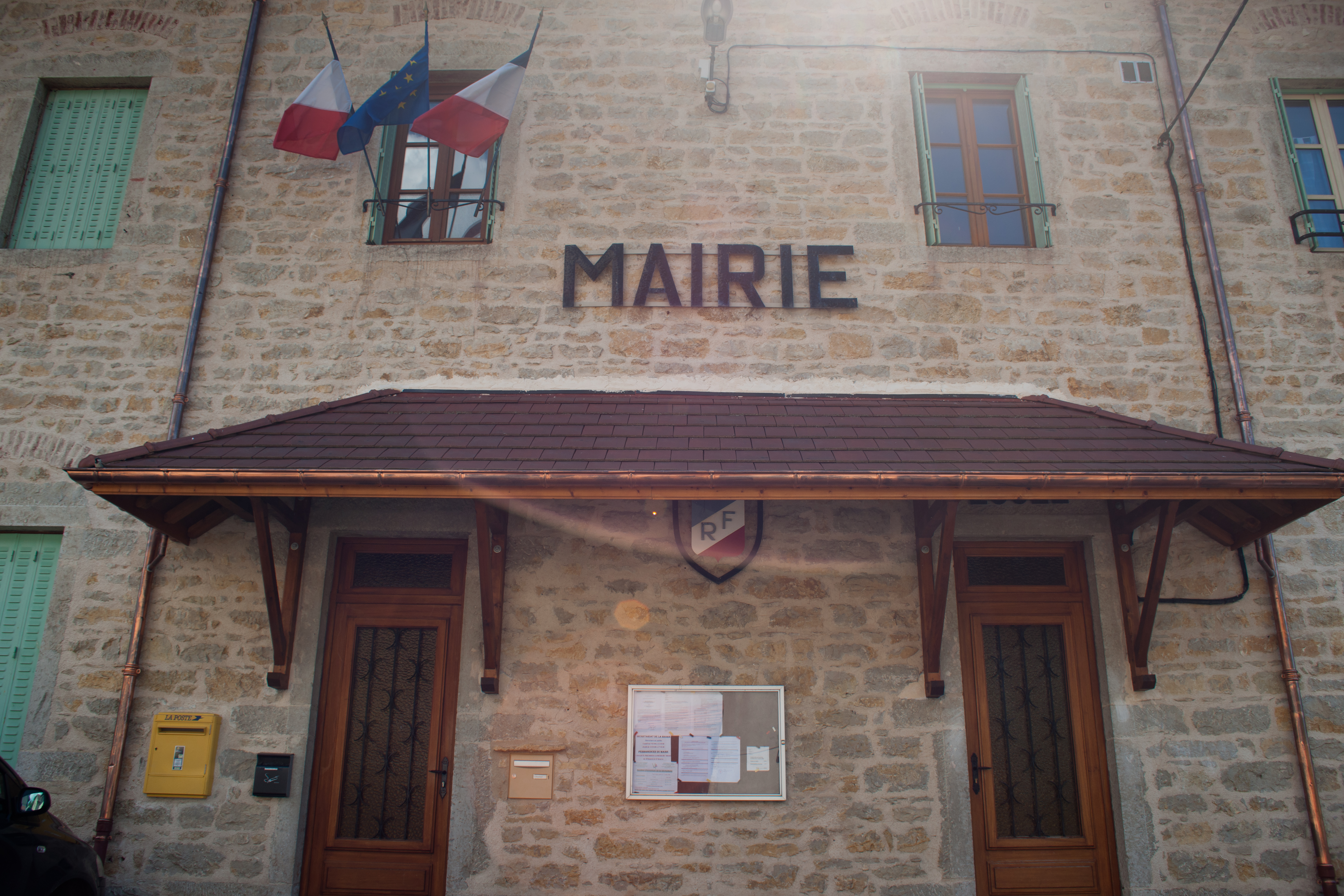
- Town hall
- Location of Arandas
- Location within France Location within Auvergne-Rhône-Alpes
- Coordinates: 45°53′45″N 5°29′14″E
- Country: France
- Region: Auvergne-Rhône-Alpes
- Department: Ain
- Arrondissement: Belley
- Canton: Ambérieu-en-Bugey
- Intercommunality: La Plaine de l'Ain

Government
  - Mayor (2026–32): Lionel Manos
- Area^{1}: 14.10 km^{2} (5.44 sq mi)
- Elevation: 720 m (2,360 ft)
- Highest elevation: 939 m (3,081 ft)
- Lowest elevation: 455 m (1,493 ft)
- Population (2023): 138
  - Density: 9.79/km^{2} (25.3/sq mi)
- Time zone: UTC+01:00 (CET)
  - Summer (DST): UTC+02:00 (CEST)
- INSEE/Postal code: 01013 /01230
- ^{1} French Land Register data, which excludes lakes, ponds, glaciers > 1 km^{2} (0.386 sq mi or 247 acres) and river estuaries.

Arandas is a commune in the Ain department in the Auvergne-Rhône-Alpes region of central-eastern France.

The commune covers an area of 14.10 km² (5.44 sq mi). Lionel Manos is the mayor for the 2026-2032 tenure.

== Geography ==
Arandas is some 50 km north-west of Aix-les-Bains and 10 km south-west of Hauteville-Lompnes. It can be accessed by the D 104 from Argis in the north running south to the village then continuing south as the D 104^{A} through the heart of the commune to join the D 32 south of the commune. The D 104 itself reverses direction in the village and heads north-west to join the D 73. The commune has some farmland but is heavily forested and mountainous. There are no villages or hamlets in the commune other than Arandas.

The Bossiere stream rises near the village and flows west to join the Galine river. The Ruisseau de Grinand also rises in the north of the commune, forming part of the northern boundary before flowing into the Galine.

== History ==
In the Middle Ages Arandas was a lordship with the most famous lord being the poet Claude Guichard in the 16th century. The commune was separated from Conand in 1865.

== Administration ==
The municipality of Arandas is a member of the Community of Communes of Plaine de l'Ain, a public inter-municipal cooperation establishment (EPCI) with its own taxation created on 15 December 2002, with its headquarters in Chazey-sur-Ain.

Administratively, Arandas is part of the Arrondissement of Belley, the Ain department, and the Auvergne-Rhône-Alpes region. In terms of electoral representation, it falls under the Ambérieu-en-Bugey canton for the election of departmental councilors, since the cantonal reorganization of 2014 came into effect in 2015, and the fifth constituency of Ain for legislative elections, since the latest electoral division in 2010.

== Administration ==
List of mayors of Arandas
From	To	Name
1995	2002	Pierre Ronchall
2002	2008	Gilbert Cagnin
2008	2014	Gérard Duclaux
2014	2020	Jean-Marc Manos
2020	Present	Lionel Manos

== Population ==
Historical population
Year	Pop.	±% p.a.
1968	143	—
1975	140	−0.30%
1982	145	+0.50%
1990	128	−1.55%
1999	135	+0.59%
2007	158	+1.99%
2012	160	+0.25%
2017	144	−2.09%
2023	138	−0.71%
Source: INSEE

== Personalities ==
- Anthelme Ferrand (1758-1834), politician, member of the Convention and the Council of Five Hundred was born in the commune.

== See also ==
- Communes of the Ain department

=== External links ===
- Arandas on the old National Geographic Institute website (in French)
- Arandas on Géoportail, National Geographic Institute (IGN) website (in French)
- Arandas on the 1750 Cassini Map
