= Argis =

Commune in Auvergne-Rhône-Alpes, France

- Commune
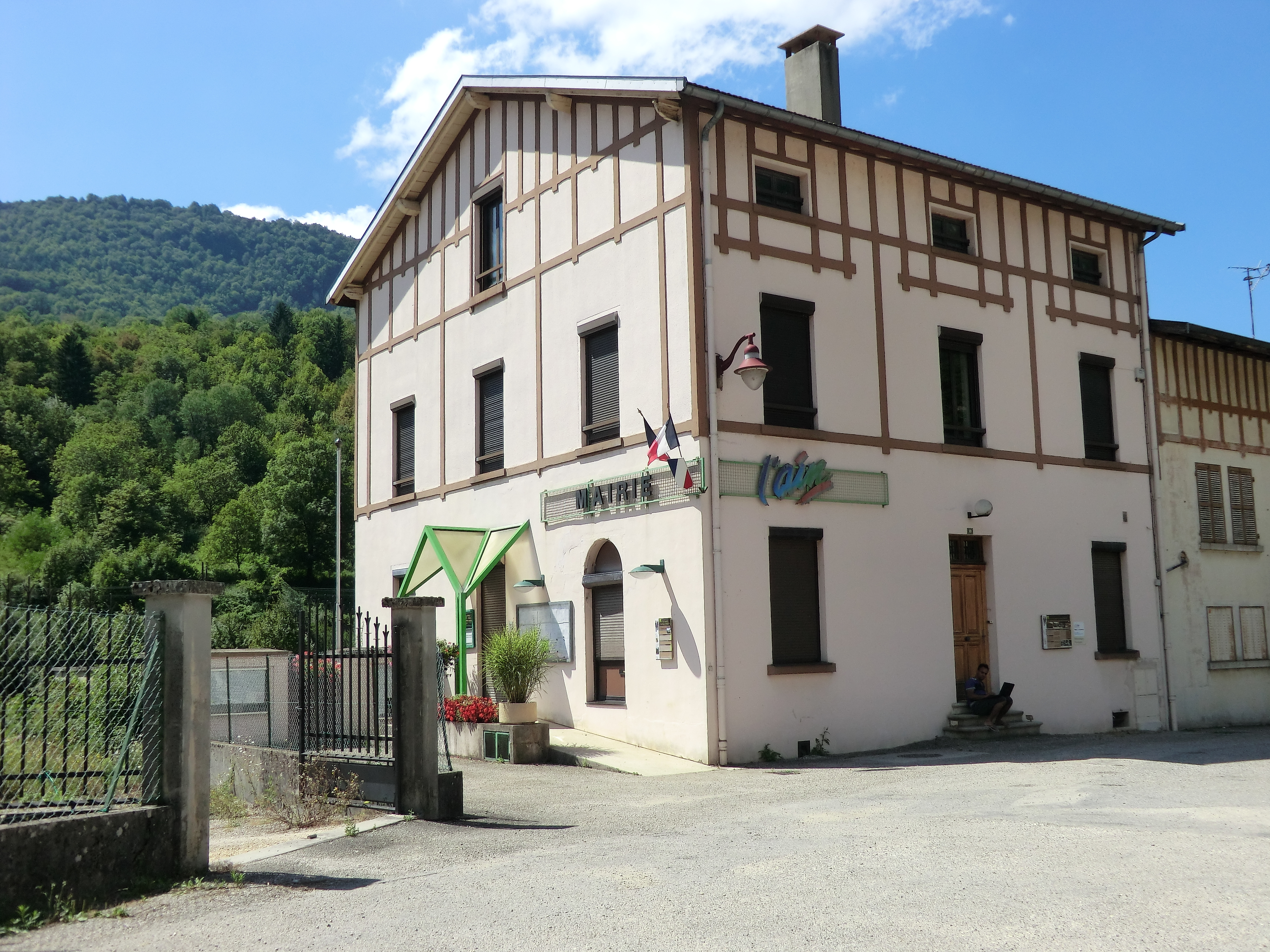
- Town hall

- Coat of arms
- Location of Argis
- Location within France Location within Auvergne-Rhône-Alpes
- Coordinates: 45°56′05″N 5°29′30″E
- Country: France
- Region: Auvergne-Rhône-Alpes
- Department: Ain
- Arrondissement: Belley
- Canton: Ambérieu-en-Bugey
- Intercommunality: La Plaine de l'Ain

Government
  - Mayor (2022–2026): Laurent Bou
- Area^{1}: 7.84 km^{2} (3.03 sq mi)
- Elevation: 320 m (1,050 ft)
- Highest elevation: 819 m (2,687 ft)
- Lowest elevation: 300 m (980 ft)
- Population (2023): 419
  - Density: 53.4/km^{2} (138/sq mi)
- Time zone: UTC+01:00 (CET)
  - Summer (DST): UTC+02:00 (CEST)
- INSEE/Postal code: 01017 /01230
- ^{1} French Land Register data, which excludes lakes, ponds, glaciers > 1 km^{2} (0.386 sq mi or 247 acres) and river estuaries.

Argis is a commune in the Ain department in the Auvergne-Rhône-Alpes region of eastern France.

The commune covers an area of 7.84 km^{2} (3.03 sq mi). Laurent Bou is the mayor for the 2020-2026 tenure.

== Geography ==
Argis is in the mountains of the southern Jura in the mountains of Bugey in the valley of the Albarine between Tenay and Saint-Rambert-en-Bugey. Altitude varies from 315 metres in the valley to 800 metres on the slopes of the valley.

The commune is some 10 km east of Amberieu-en-Bugey and 10 km south-west of Hauteville-Lompnes. It can be accessed on the D1504 road from Saint-Rambert-en-Bugey in the north-west passing through the northern border of the commune then south to the village and continuing south to Tenay. The D104 road also goes from the village over a tortuous mountain route to Arandas in the south-west. There are also many small mountain roads in the commune. The railway line from Saint-Rambert-en-Bugey to Tenay also passes through the commune parallel to the D1504 road. There is no station in the commune with the nearest station being the one near Tenay. In addition to the village there is the small hamlet of Plomb in the south. The commune is mountainous and heavily forested.

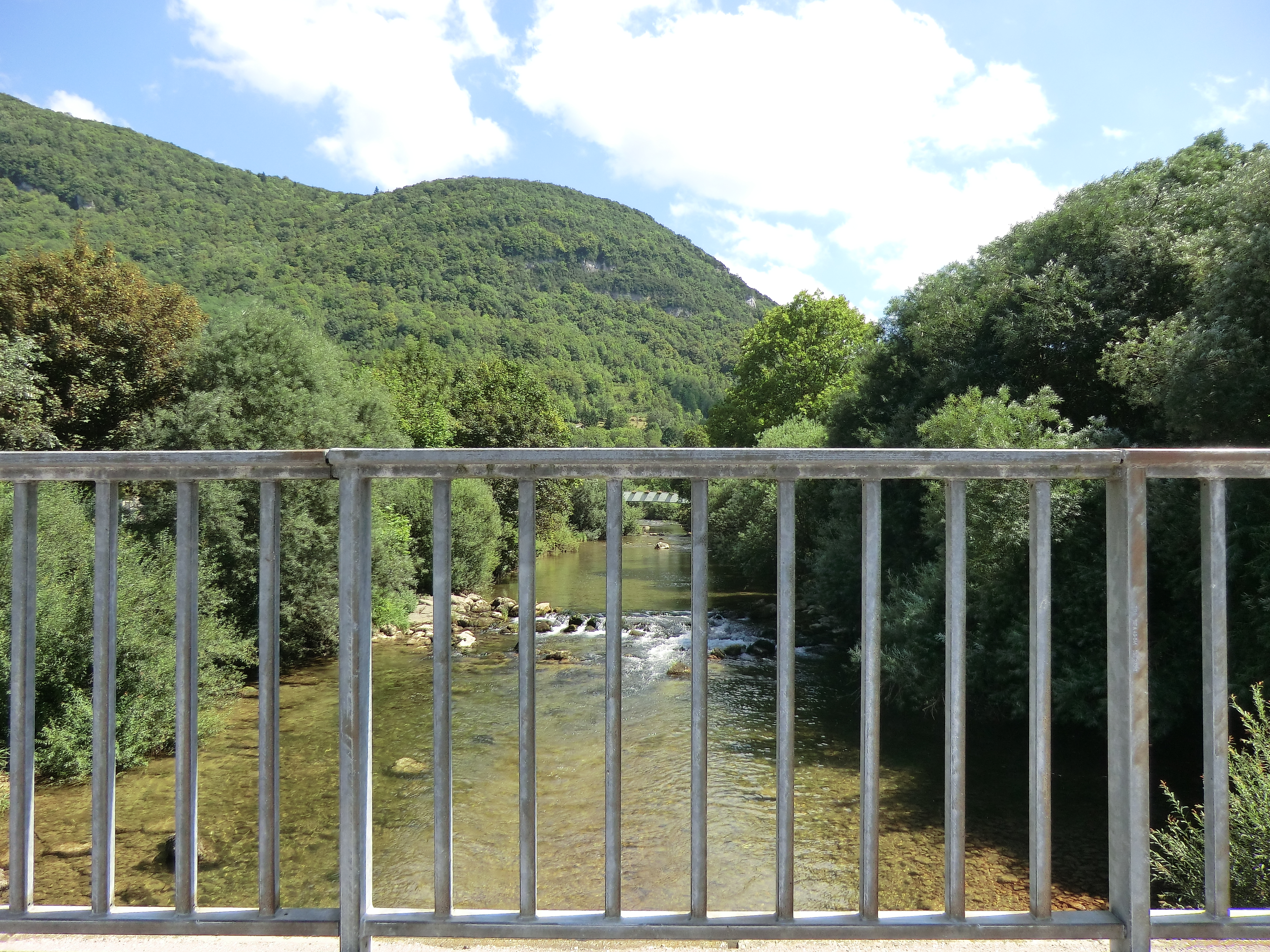
The Albarine at Argis

The Albarine river passes through the commune from south to north parallel with the railway and the D1504 continuing west to join the Ain near Chez le Bret. A number of streams flow into the river including the Ruisseau de la Gorge, the Ruisseau de la Tine, the Biez Molet, the Biez Michel, and the Biez Gallet.

== History ==
There was a lordship and a castle in the Middle Ages.

=== Toponymy ===
Over the centuries, Argis has been called:

- Argil (1242)
- De Argillo (1385)
- Argit (1650)
- Argy (1734)

=== Heraldry ===
Arms of Argis	The status of the official emblem has yet to be determined. Blazon: Or, a bend azure semy of mullets of Or..

== Administration ==
List of mayors of Argis

From	To	Name
1944	1959	Louis Dillenschneider
1959	1974	Louis Ronchall
1974	1974	Jean Reverdy
1974	1999 (resigned)	André Ollier
1999	2001	Jean-Claude Marquis
2001	2022	Marcel Chevé
2022	incumbent	Laurent Bou

== Population ==
Historical population
Year	Pop.	±% p.a.
1968	582	—
1975	479	−2.74%
1982	447	−0.98%
1990	405	−1.23%
1999	390	−0.42%
2007	421	+0.96%
2012	424	+0.14%
2017	442	+0.83%
2023	419	−0.89%
Source: INSEE

== Sites and monuments ==
- Waterfalls de la Côte and de la Pissoire.

== Photo gallery ==
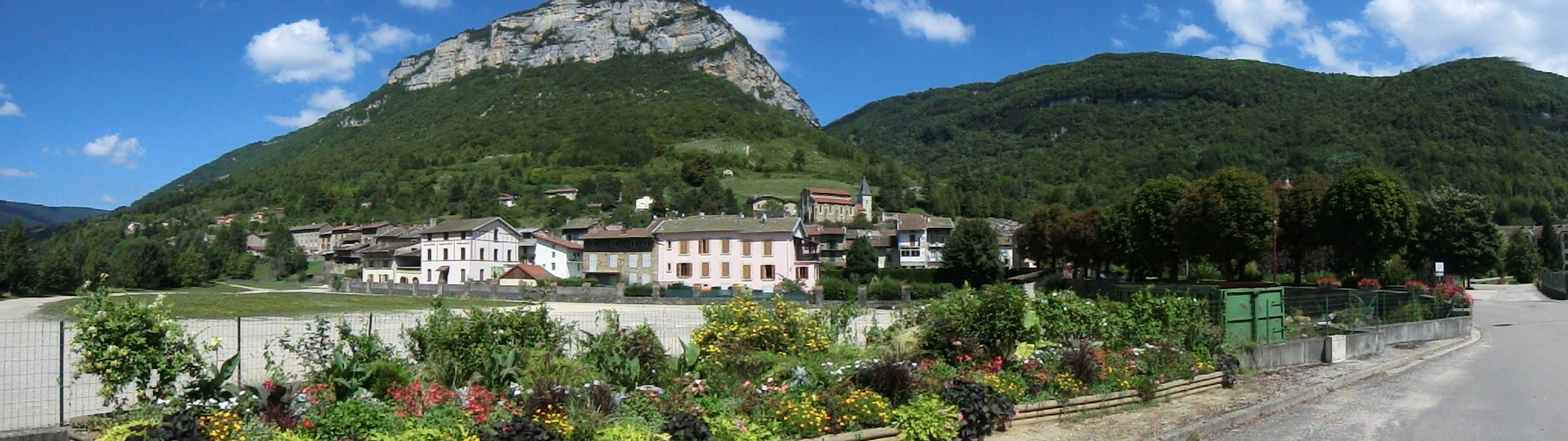
Argis Panorama

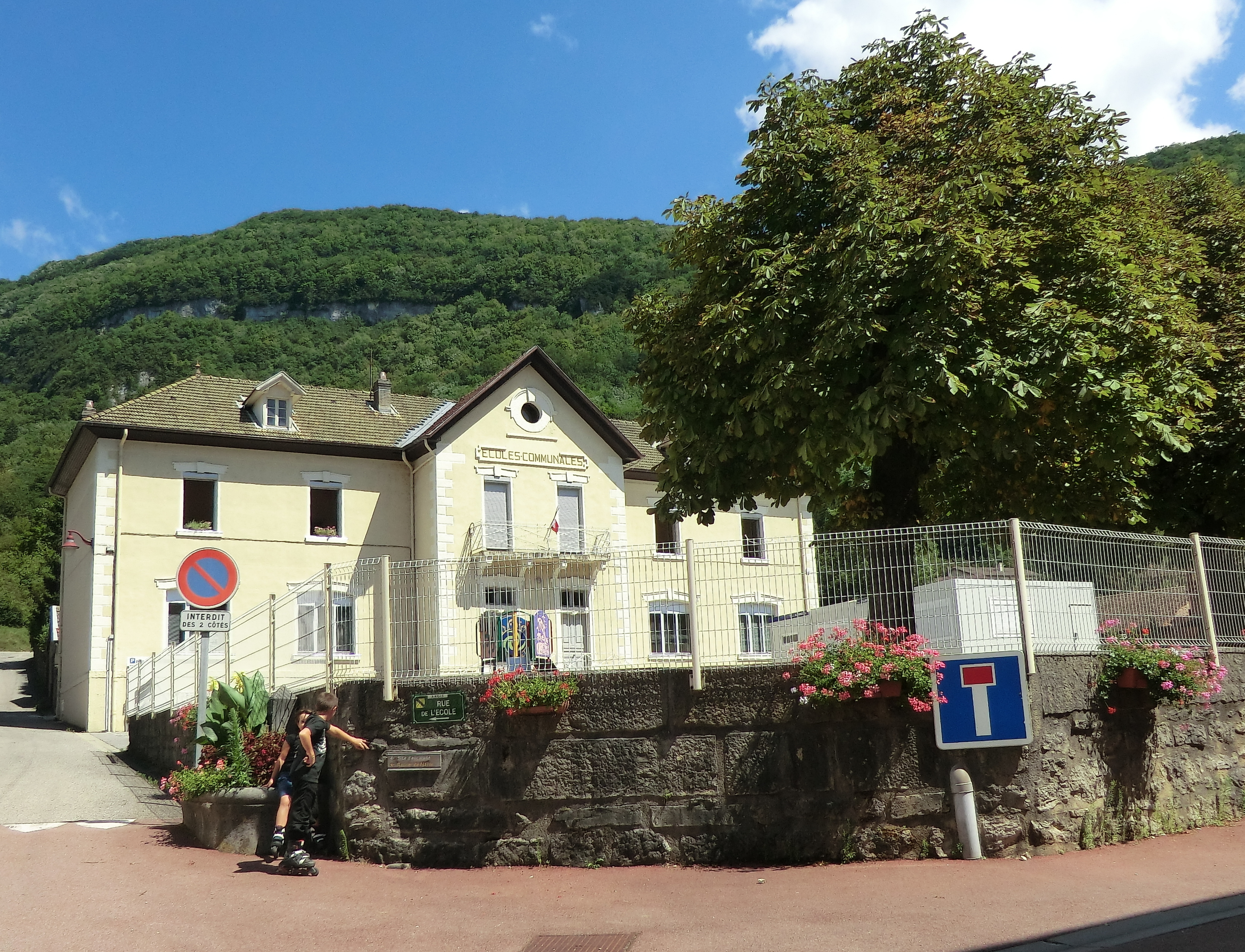
The School

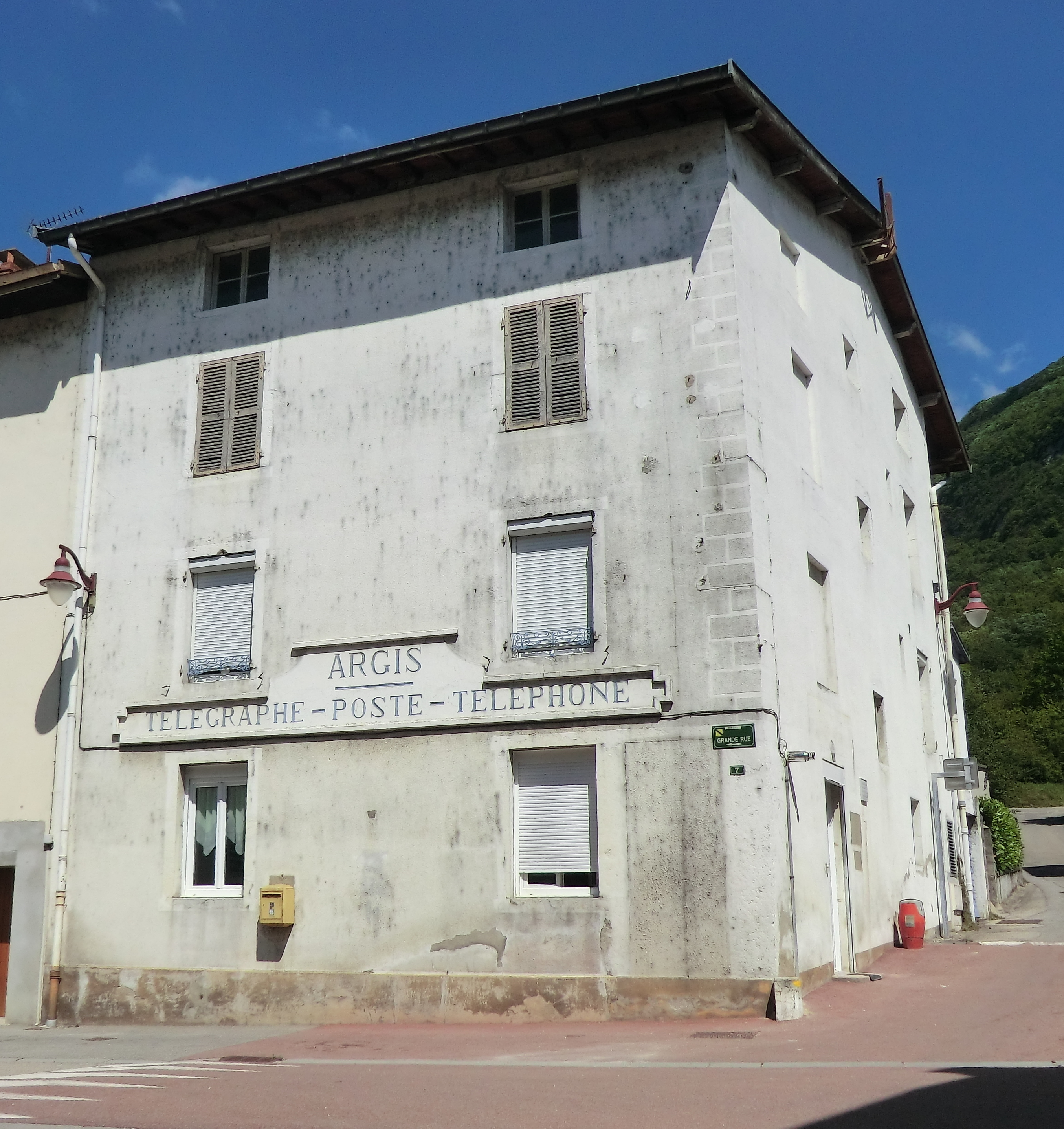
The old Post Office

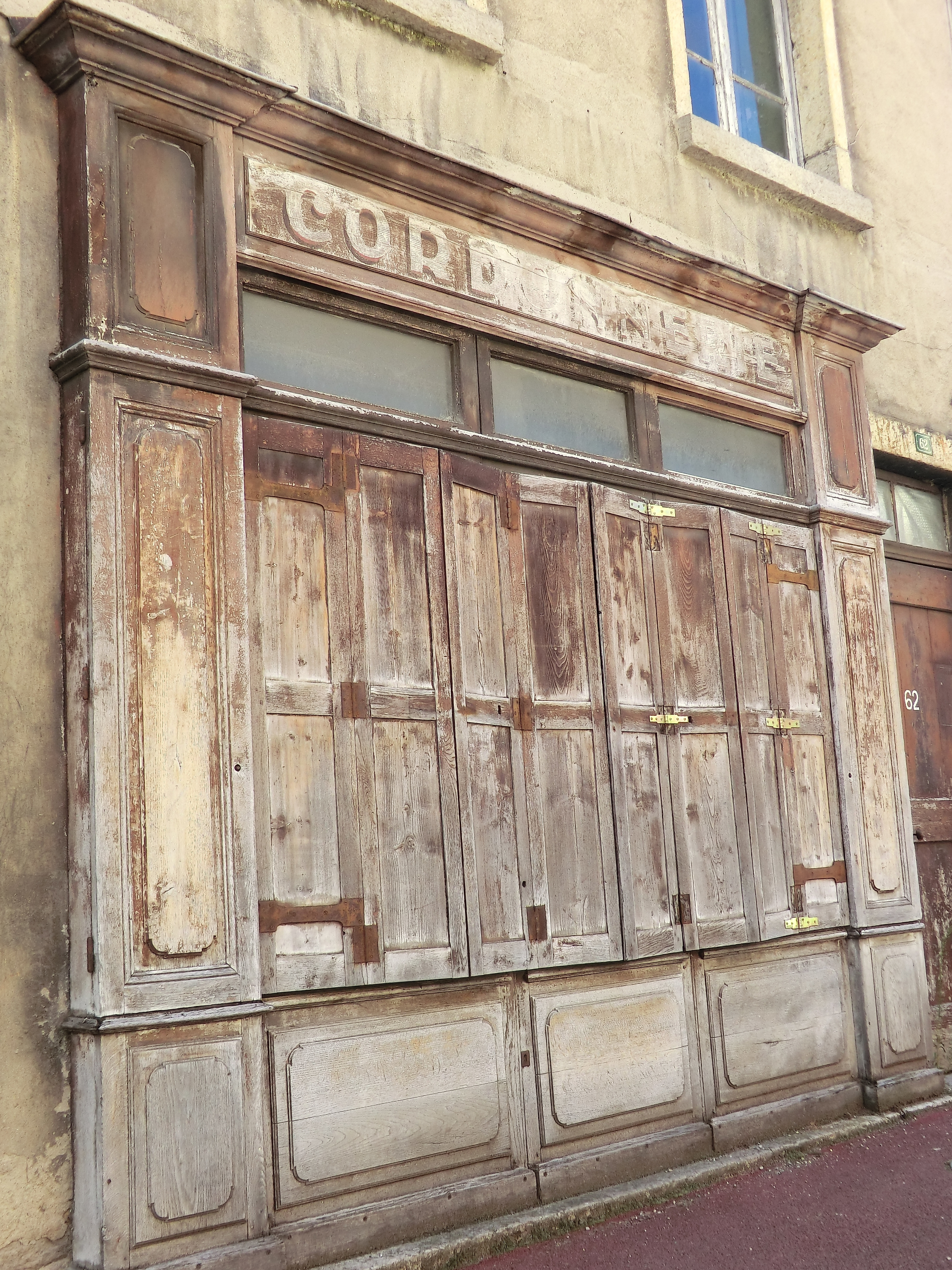
The old cobbler's shop

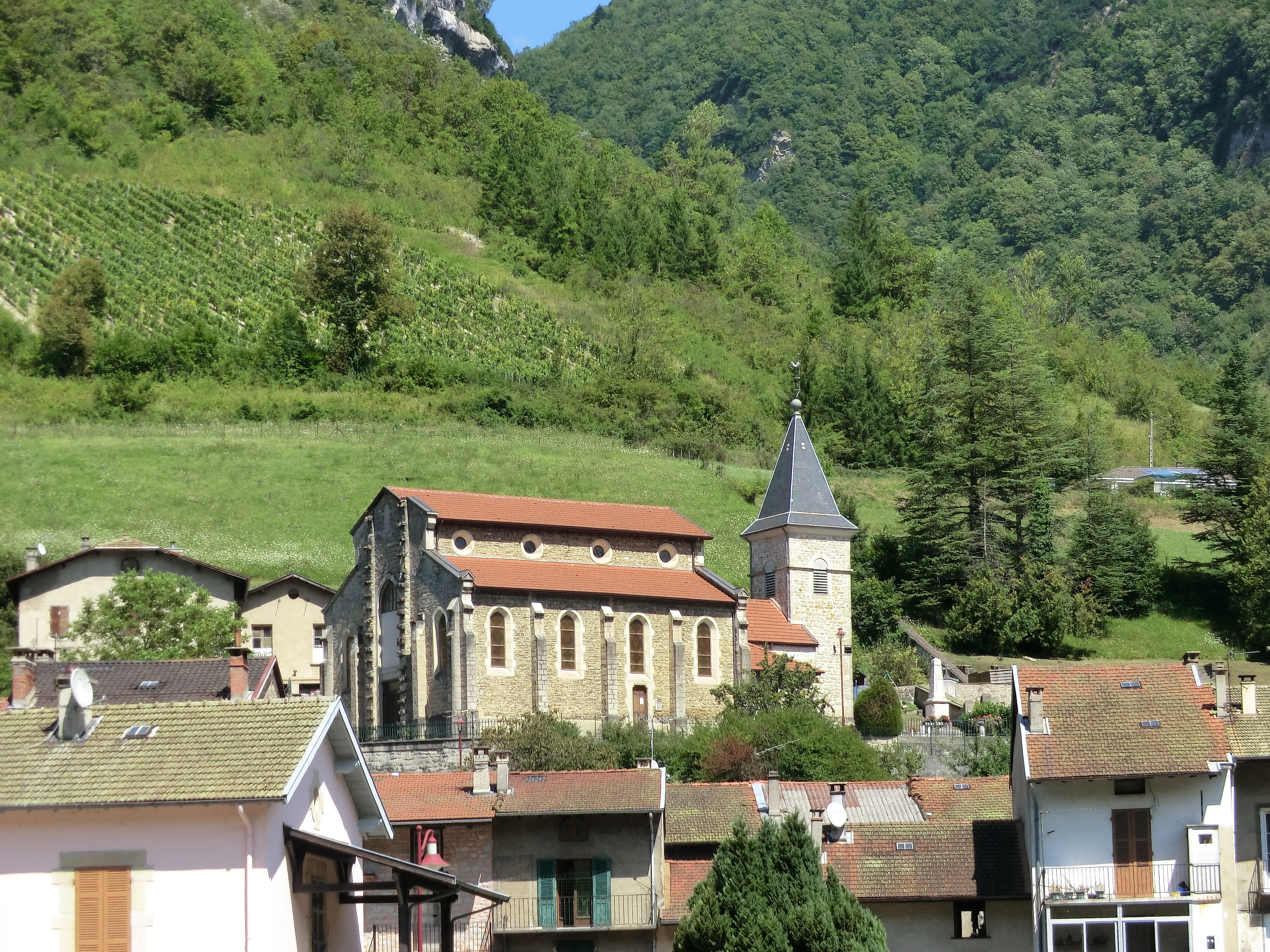
View of Argis and the church

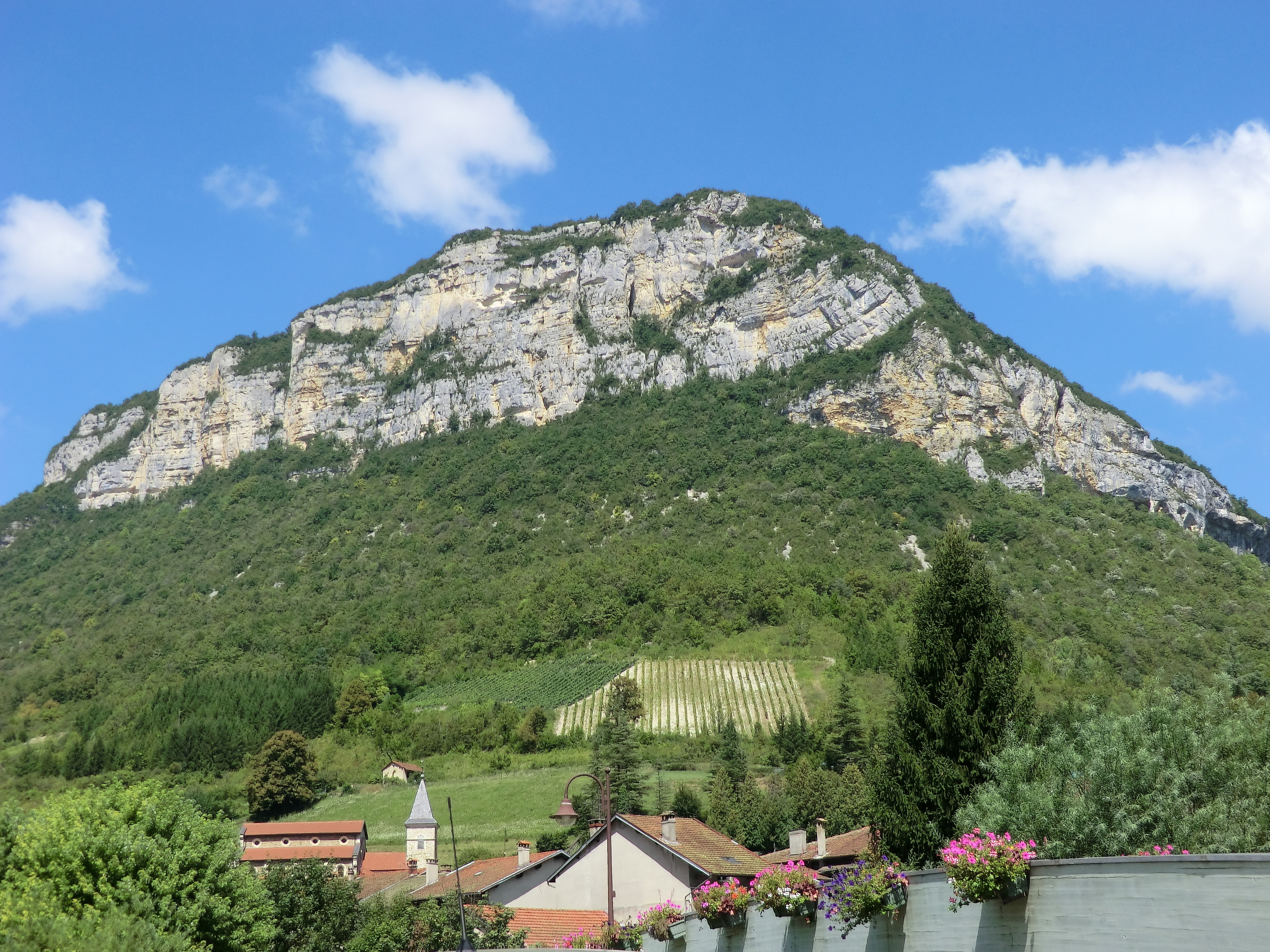
View of Argis

== Notable people ==
- Antoine-Gaspard Boucher d'Argis was born in the commune on 3 April 1708.

== See also ==
- Communes of the Ain department
