= Douvres =

Commune in Auvergne-Rhône-Alpes, France

- Commune
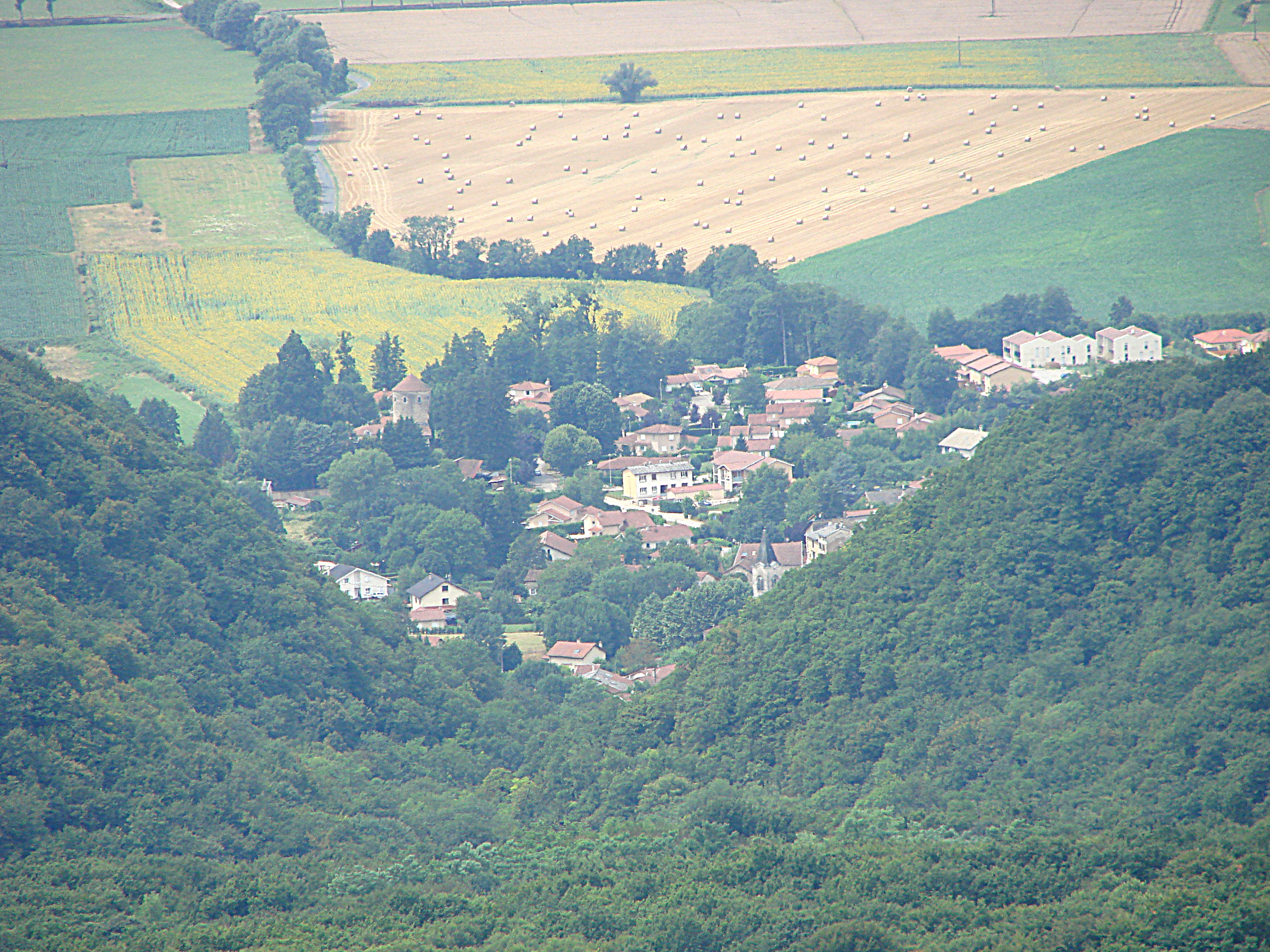

- Coat of arms
- Location of Douvres
- Location within France Location within Auvergne-Rhône-Alpes
- Coordinates: 45°59′23″N 5°22′26″E
- Country: France
- Region: Auvergne-Rhône-Alpes
- Department: Ain
- Arrondissement: Belley
- Canton: Ambérieu-en-Bugey
- Intercommunality: Plaine de l'Ain

Government
  - Mayor (2026–32): Serge Gomes
- Area^{1}: 5.26 km^{2} (2.03 sq mi)
- Elevation: 270 m (890 ft)
- Highest elevation: 480 m (1,570 ft)
- Lowest elevation: 249 m (817 ft)
- Population (2023): 1,104
  - Density: 210/km^{2} (544/sq mi)
- Time zone: UTC+01:00 (CET)
  - Summer (DST): UTC+02:00 (CEST)
- INSEE/Postal code: 01149 /01500
- ^{1} French Land Register data, which excludes lakes, ponds, glaciers > 1 km^{2} (0.386 sq mi or 247 acres) and river estuaries.

Douvres (French pronunciation: [duvʁ]) is a commune in the eastern French department of Ain.

== Population ==
Historical population
Year	Pop.	±% p.a.
1968	254	—
1975	298	+2.31%
1982	534	+8.69%
1990	606	+1.59%
1999	646	+0.71%
2007	920	+4.52%
2012	993	+1.54%
2017	1,041	+0.95%
2023	1,104	+0.98%
Source: INSEE

== See also ==
- Communes of the Ain department
- Battle of Douvres Radar Station
