= Saint-Maurice-de-Rémens =

Commune in Auvergne-Rhône-Alpes, France

- Commune
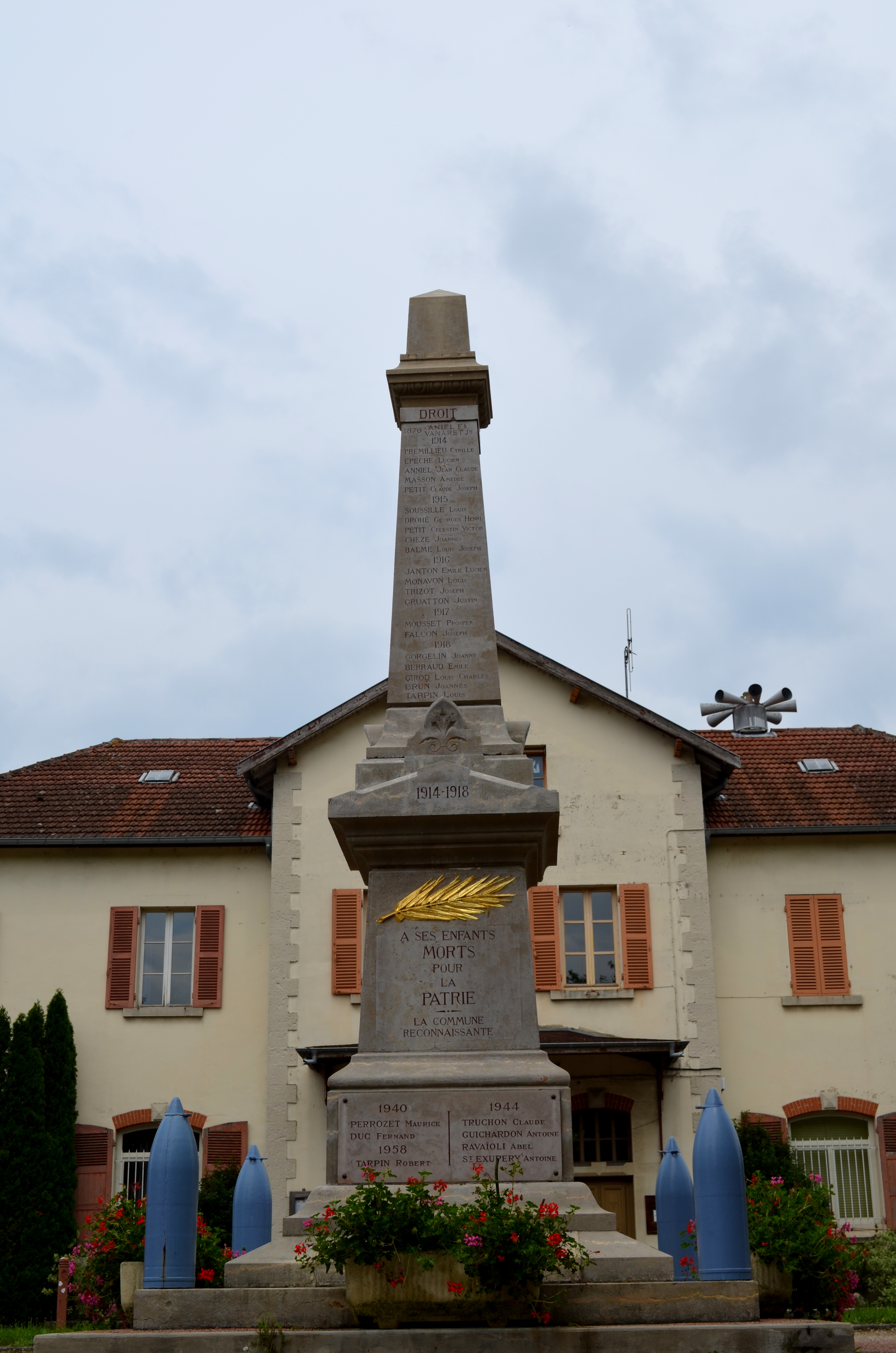
- War memorial and town hall

- Coat of arms
- Location of Saint-Maurice-de-Rémens
- Location within France Location within Auvergne-Rhône-Alpes
- Coordinates: 45°57′00″N 5°17′00″E
- Country: France
- Region: Auvergne-Rhône-Alpes
- Department: Ain
- Arrondissement: Belley
- Canton: Ambérieu-en-Bugey
- Intercommunality: Plaine de l'Ain

Government
  - Mayor (2026–32): Éric Gaillard
- Area^{1}: 10.4 km^{2} (4.0 sq mi)
- Elevation: 234 m (768 ft)
- Highest elevation: 235 m (771 ft)
- Lowest elevation: 212 m (696 ft)
- Population (2023): 756
  - Density: 72.7/km^{2} (188/sq mi)
- Time zone: UTC+01:00 (CET)
  - Summer (DST): UTC+02:00 (CEST)
- INSEE/Postal code: 01379 /01500
- ^{1} French Land Register data, which excludes lakes, ponds, glaciers > 1 km^{2} (0.386 sq mi or 247 acres) and river estuaries.

Saint-Maurice-de-Rémens (French pronunciation: [sɛ̃ mɔʁis də ʁemɑ̃]) is a commune in the Ain department in eastern France.

== Geography ==
The village lies on the left bank of the river Albarine, which flows west through the commune. The river Ain forms most of the commune's southwestern border.

== Population ==
Historical population
Year	Pop.	±% p.a.
1968	441	—
1975	436	−0.16%
1982	428	−0.26%
1990	613	+4.59%
1999	604	−0.16%
2007	670	+1.30%
2012	724	+1.56%
2017	756	+0.87%
2023	756	+0.00%
Source: INSEE

== See also ==
- Communes of the Ain department
