= Bettant =

Commune in Auvergne-Rhône-Alpes, France

- Commune
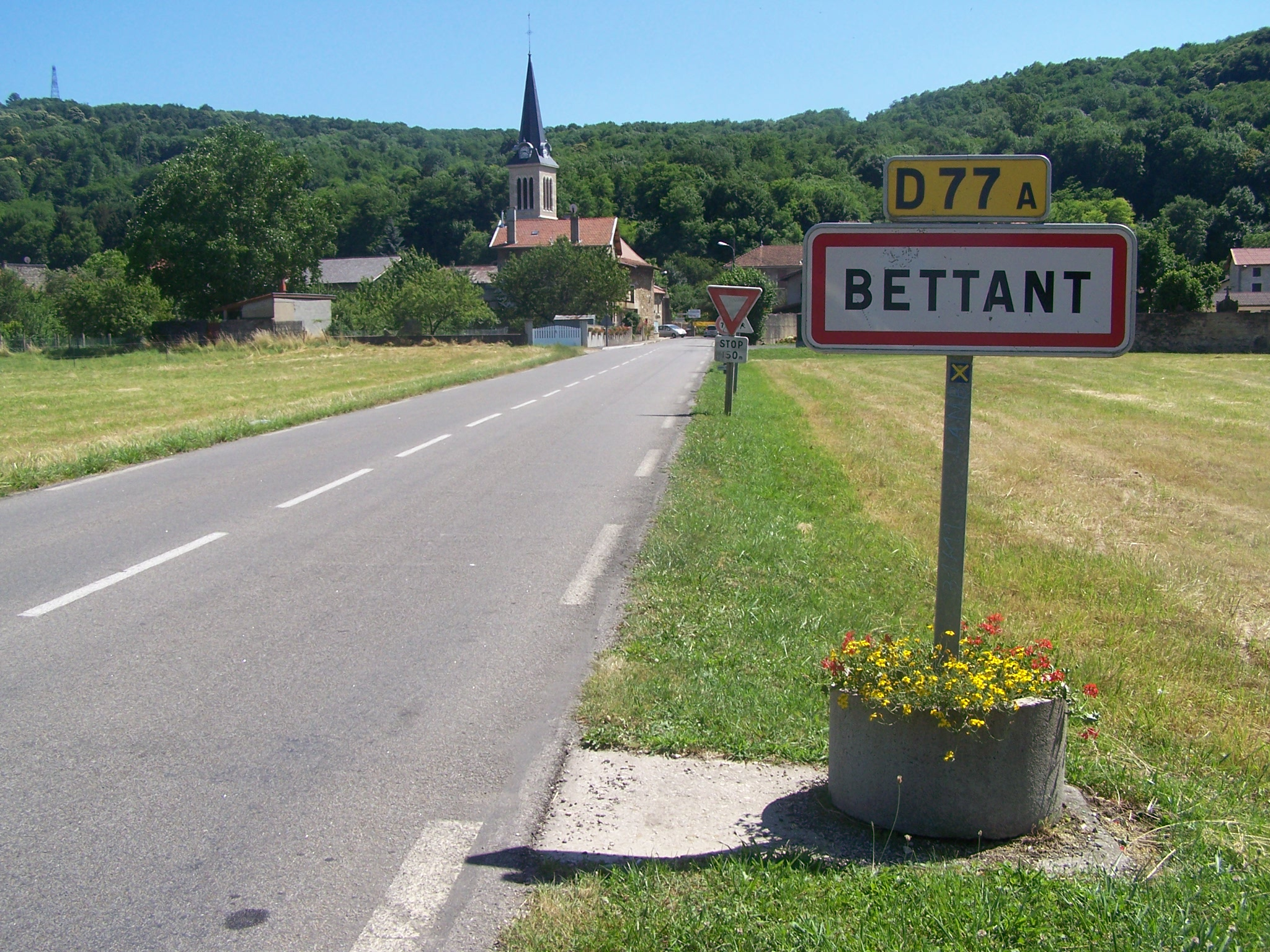
- Location of Bettant
- Location within France Location within Auvergne-Rhône-Alpes
- Coordinates: 45°56′00″N 5°22′00″E
- Country: France
- Region: Auvergne-Rhône-Alpes
- Department: Ain
- Arrondissement: Belley
- Canton: Ambérieu-en-Bugey
- Intercommunality: Plaine de l'Ain

Government
  - Mayor (2026–32): Eric Maitre
- Area^{1}: 3.37 km^{2} (1.30 sq mi)
- Highest elevation: 605 m (1,985 ft)
- Lowest elevation: 245 m (804 ft)
- Population (2023): 774
  - Density: 230/km^{2} (595/sq mi)
- Time zone: UTC+01:00 (CET)
  - Summer (DST): UTC+02:00 (CEST)
- INSEE/Postal code: 01041 /01500
- Website: https://mairie-bettant.fr/
- ^{1} French Land Register data, which excludes lakes, ponds, glaciers > 1 km^{2} (0.386 sq mi or 247 acres) and river estuaries.

Bettant (French pronunciation: [bɛtɑ̃]) is a commune in the Ain department in central-eastern France.

== Geography ==
The village lies in the commune's northwestern part, on the left bank of the river Albarine, which forms most of the commune's northern and eastern borders.

== Population ==
Historical population
| Year | Pop. | ±% p.a. |
|---|---|---|
| 1968 | 567 | — |
| 1975 | 586 | +0.47% |
| 1982 | 594 | +0.19% |
| 1990 | 703 | +2.13% |
| 1999 | 683 | −0.32% |
| 2007 | 711 | +0.50% |
| 2012 | 739 | +0.78% |
| 2017 | 748 | +0.24% |
| 2023 | 774 | +0.57% |
Source: INSEE

== See also ==
- Communes of the Ain department
