= Cleyzieu =

Commune in Auvergne-Rhône-Alpes, France

Cleyzieu Cllêziœx (Arpitan)
- Commune
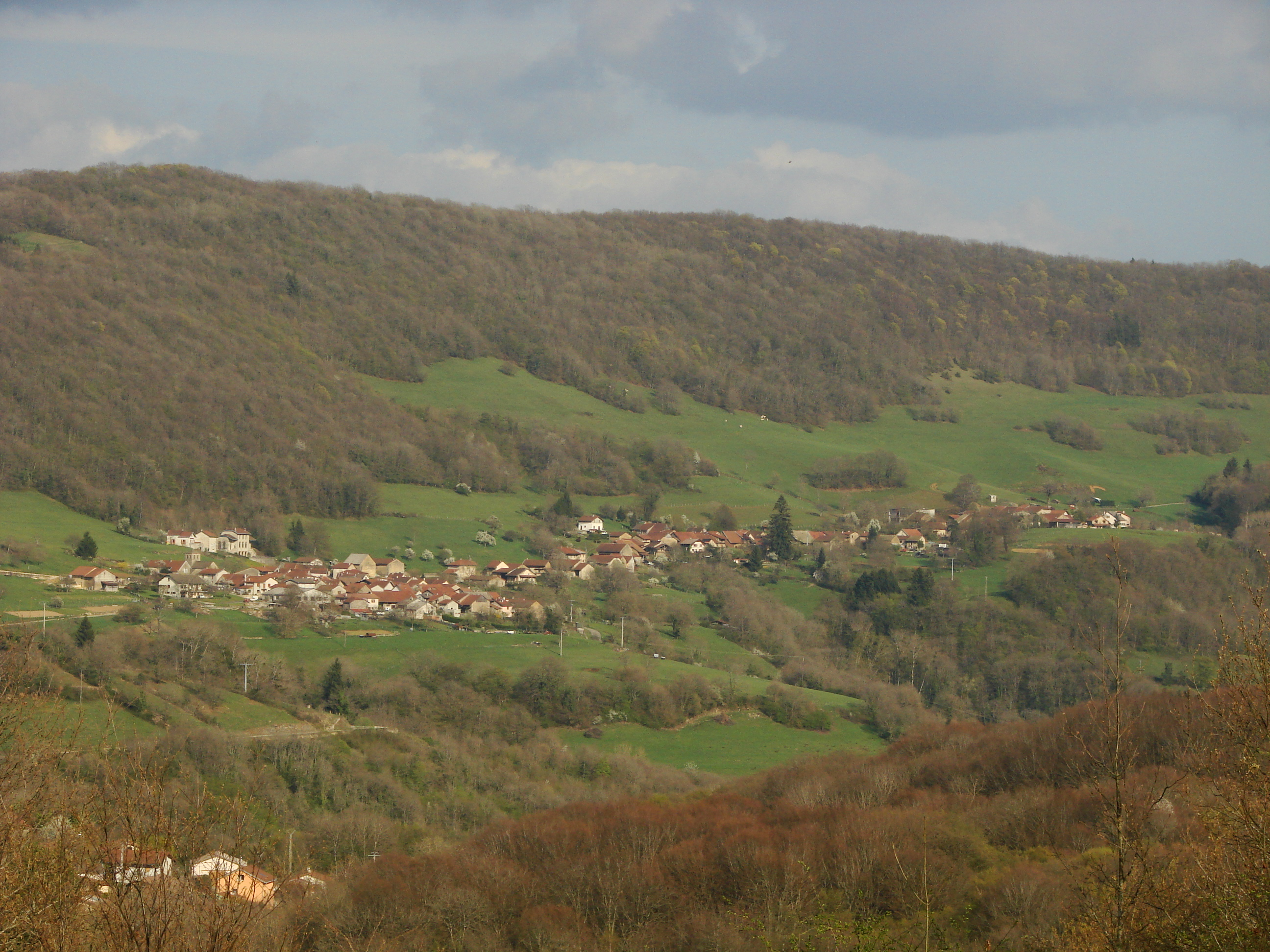
- Location of Cleyzieu
- Location within France Location within Auvergne-Rhône-Alpes
- Coordinates: 45°54′00″N 5°26′00″E
- Country: France
- Region: Auvergne-Rhône-Alpes
- Department: Ain
- Arrondissement: Belley
- Canton: Ambérieu-en-Bugey
- Intercommunality: Plaine de l'Ain

Government
  - Mayor (2026–32): Emilie Lagrut
- Area^{1}: 7.82 km^{2} (3.02 sq mi)
- Elevation: 594 m (1,949 ft)
- Highest elevation: 927 m (3,041 ft)
- Lowest elevation: 440 m (1,440 ft)
- Population (2023): 143
  - Density: 18.3/km^{2} (47.4/sq mi)
- Time zone: UTC+01:00 (CET)
  - Summer (DST): UTC+02:00 (CEST)
- INSEE/Postal code: 01107 /01230
- ^{1} French Land Register data, which excludes lakes, ponds, glaciers > 1 km^{2} (0.386 sq mi or 247 acres) and river estuaries.

Cleyzieu (French pronunciation: [klɛzjø]; Arpitan: Cllêziœx) is a commune in the Ain department in eastern France.

== Population ==
Historical population
Year	Pop.	±% p.a.
1968	105	—
1975	90	−2.18%
1982	98	+1.22%
1990	84	−1.91%
1999	116	+3.65%
2007	135	+1.91%
2012	139	+0.59%
2017	136	−0.44%
2023	143	+0.84%
Source: INSEE

== See also ==
- Communes of the Ain department
