= Nivollet-Montgriffon =

Commune in Auvergne-Rhône-Alpes, France

- Commune
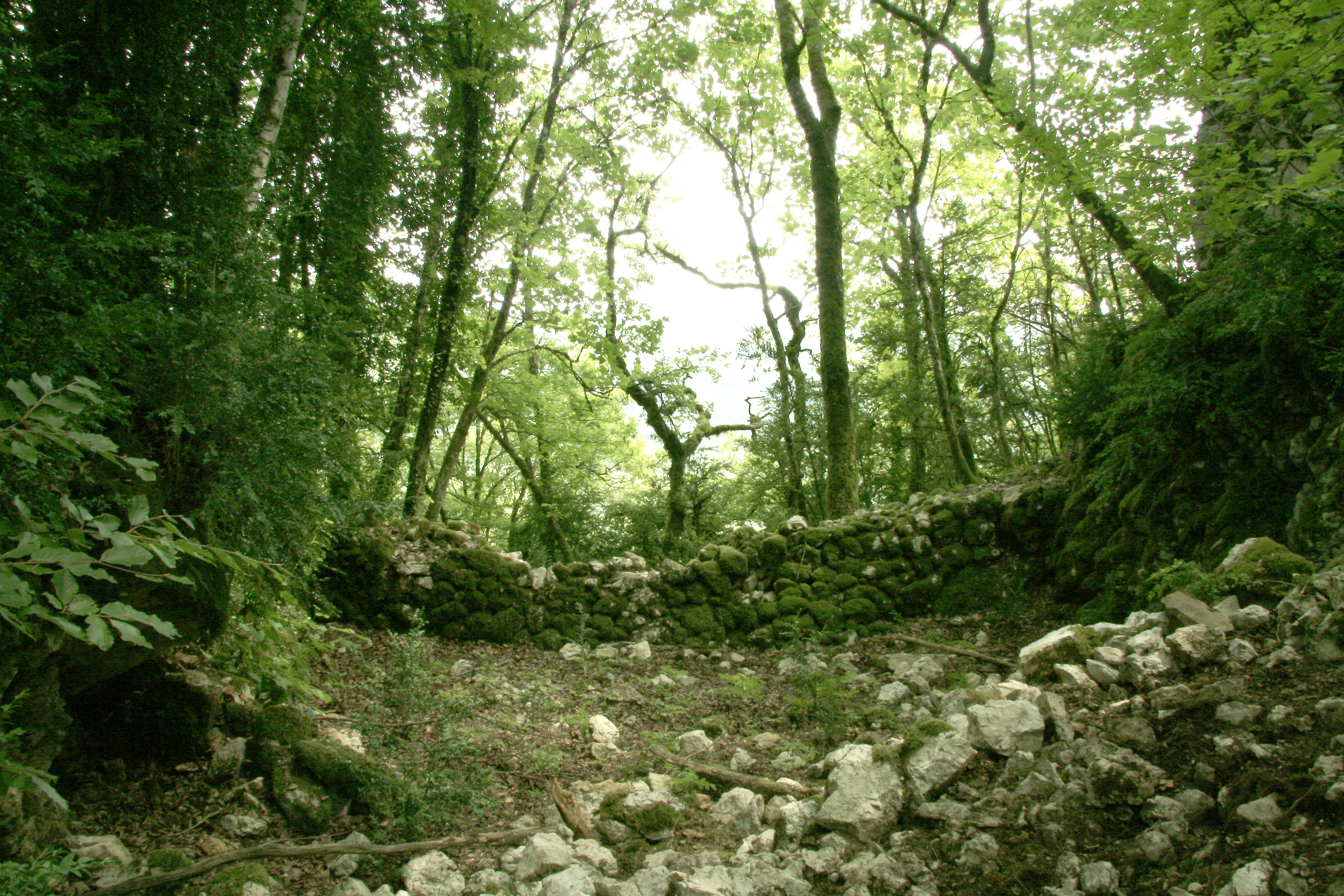
- Ruins of the chateau
- Location of Nivollet-Montgriffon
- Location within France Location within Auvergne-Rhône-Alpes
- Coordinates: 45°59′00″N 5°26′00″E
- Country: France
- Region: Auvergne-Rhône-Alpes
- Department: Ain
- Arrondissement: Belley
- Canton: Ambérieu-en-Bugey

Government
  - Mayor (2026–32): Emmanuel Simonnet
- Area^{1}: 8.24 km^{2} (3.18 sq mi)
- Elevation: 598 m (1,962 ft)
- Highest elevation: 833 m (2,733 ft)
- Lowest elevation: 440 m (1,440 ft)
- Population (2023): 122
  - Density: 14.8/km^{2} (38.3/sq mi)
- Time zone: UTC+01:00 (CET)
  - Summer (DST): UTC+02:00 (CEST)
- INSEE/Postal code: 01277 /01230
- ^{1} French Land Register data, which excludes lakes, ponds, glaciers > 1 km^{2} (0.386 sq mi or 247 acres) and river estuaries.

Nivollet-Montgriffon (French pronunciation: [nivɔlɛ mɔ̃ɡʁifɔ̃]) is a commune in the Ain department in eastern France.

== Population ==
Historical population
| Year | Pop. | ±% p.a. |
|---|---|---|
| 1968 | 103 | — |
| 1975 | 81 | −3.37% |
| 1982 | 63 | −3.53% |
| 1990 | 66 | +0.58% |
| 1999 | 87 | +3.12% |
| 2007 | 133 | +5.45% |
| 2012 | 127 | −0.92% |
| 2017 | 119 | −1.29% |
| 2023 | 122 | +0.42% |
Source: INSEE

== See also ==
- Communes of the Ain department
