= Torcieu =

Commune in Auvergne-Rhône-Alpes, France

Torcieu Torciœ (Arpitan)
- Commune
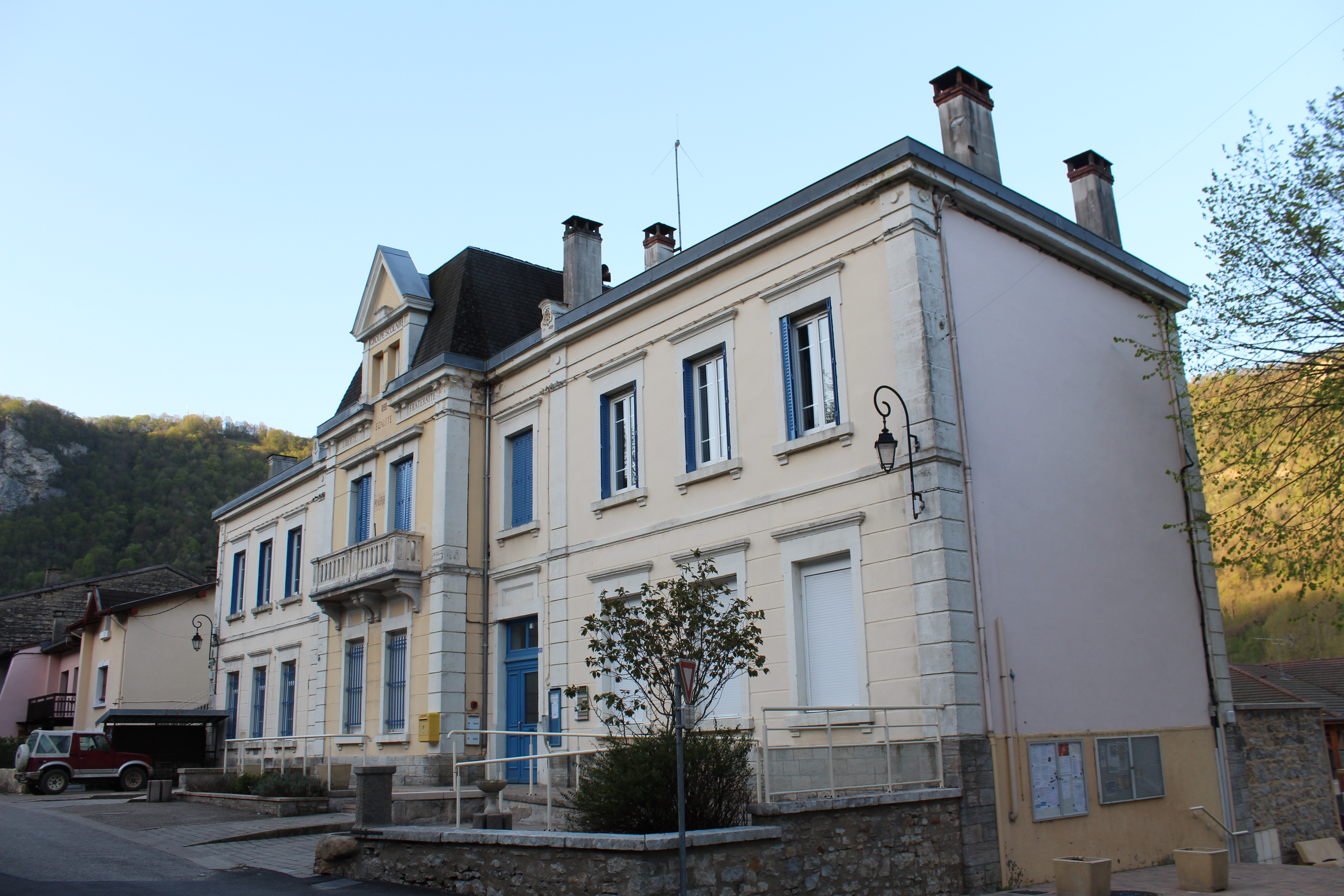
- Town hall
- Location of Torcieu
- Location within France Location within Auvergne-Rhône-Alpes
- Coordinates: 45°55′00″N 5°24′00″E
- Country: France
- Region: Auvergne-Rhône-Alpes
- Department: Ain
- Arrondissement: Belley
- Canton: Ambérieu-en-Bugey

Government
  - Mayor (2026–32): Estelle Barbarin
- Area^{1}: 10.72 km^{2} (4.14 sq mi)
- Elevation: 260 m (850 ft)
- Highest elevation: 782 m (2,566 ft)
- Lowest elevation: 257 m (843 ft)
- Population (2023): 739
  - Density: 68.9/km^{2} (179/sq mi)
- Time zone: UTC+01:00 (CET)
  - Summer (DST): UTC+02:00 (CEST)
- INSEE/Postal code: 01421 /01230
- ^{1} French Land Register data, which excludes lakes, ponds, glaciers > 1 km^{2} (0.386 sq mi or 247 acres) and river estuaries.

Torcieu (French pronunciation: [tɔʁsjø]; Arpitan: Torciœ) is a commune in the Ain department in eastern France.

== Geography ==
The village lies in the middle of the commune, on the right bank of the river Albarine, which flows west through the commune.

== Population ==
Historical population
Year	Pop.	±% p.a.
1968	429	—
1975	460	+1.00%
1982	543	+2.40%
1990	569	+0.59%
1999	646	+1.42%
2007	674	+0.53%
2012	707	+0.96%
2017	726	+0.53%
2023	739	+0.30%
Source: INSEE

== See also ==
- Communes of the Ain department
