= Château-Gaillard, Ain =

Commune in Auvergne-Rhône-Alpes, France

Château-Gaillard
- Commune
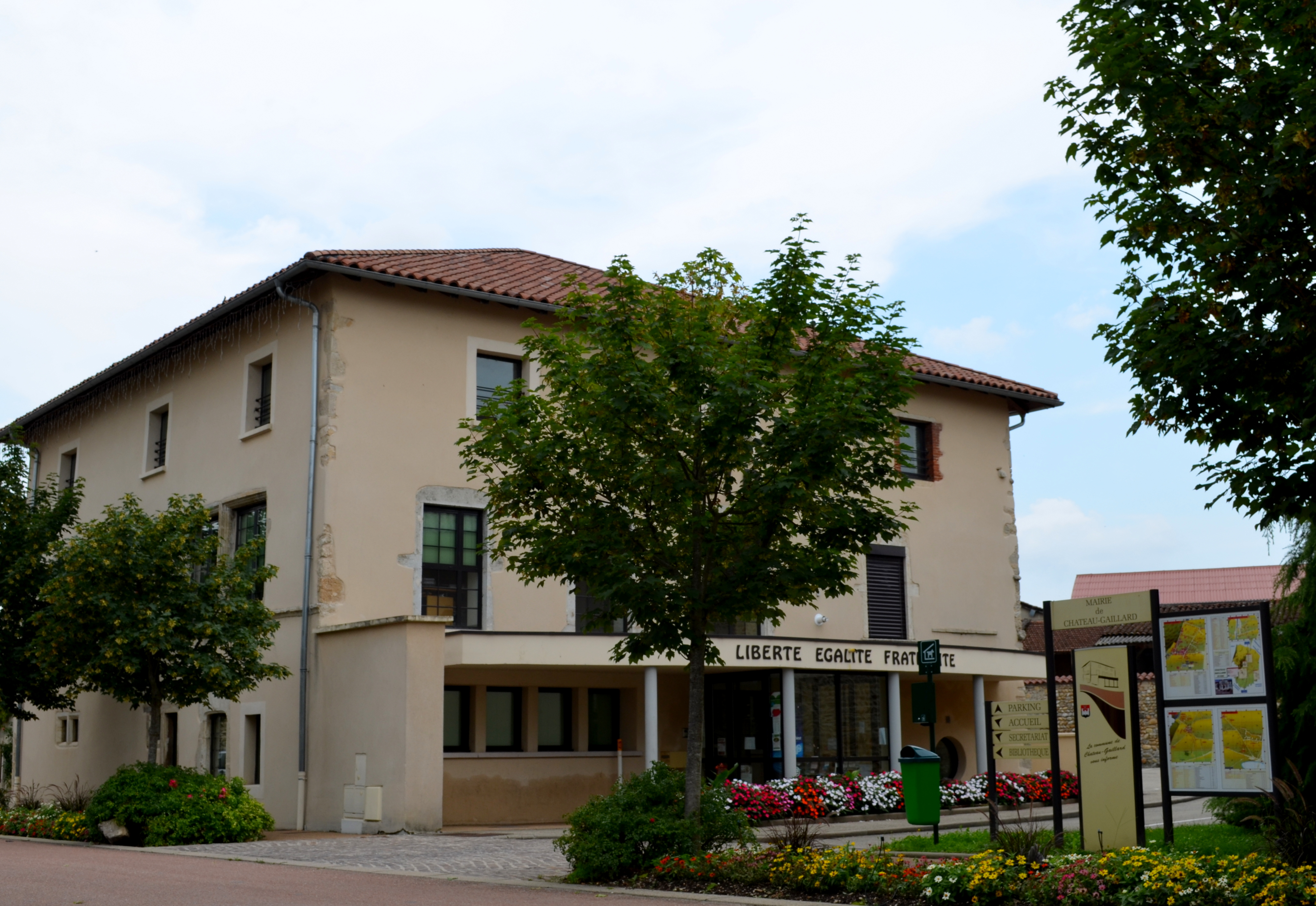
- Town hall

- Coat of arms
- Location of Château-Gaillard
- Location within France Location within Auvergne-Rhône-Alpes
- Coordinates: 45°58′N 5°18′E
- Country: France
- Region: Auvergne-Rhône-Alpes
- Department: Ain
- Arrondissement: Belley
- Canton: Ambérieu-en-Bugey
- Intercommunality: Plaine de l'Ain

Government
  - Mayor (2026–32): Clément Tarpin-Lyonnet
- Area^{1}: 16.6 km^{2} (6.4 sq mi)
- Elevation: 230 m (750 ft)
- Highest elevation: 253 m (830 ft)
- Lowest elevation: 222 m (728 ft)
- Population (2023): 2,443
  - Density: 147/km^{2} (381/sq mi)
- Time zone: UTC+01:00 (CET)
  - Summer (DST): UTC+02:00 (CEST)
- INSEE/Postal code: 01089 /01500
- ^{1} French Land Register data, which excludes lakes, ponds, glaciers > 1 km^{2} (0.386 sq mi or 247 acres) and river estuaries.

Château-Gaillard (French pronunciation: [ʃɑto ɡajaʁ]) is a commune in the eastern French department of Ain.

== Geography ==
The river Albarine forms most of the commune's southern border.

== Population ==
Historical population
Year	Pop.	±% p.a.
1968	439	—
1975	698	+6.85%
1982	832	+2.54%
1990	1,027	+2.67%
1999	1,370	+3.25%
2007	1,704	+2.76%
2012	1,881	+2.00%
2017	2,138	+2.59%
2023	2,443	+2.25%
Source: INSEE

== See also ==
- Communes of the Ain department
