= Chaley =

Commune in Auvergne-Rhône-Alpes, France

- Commune
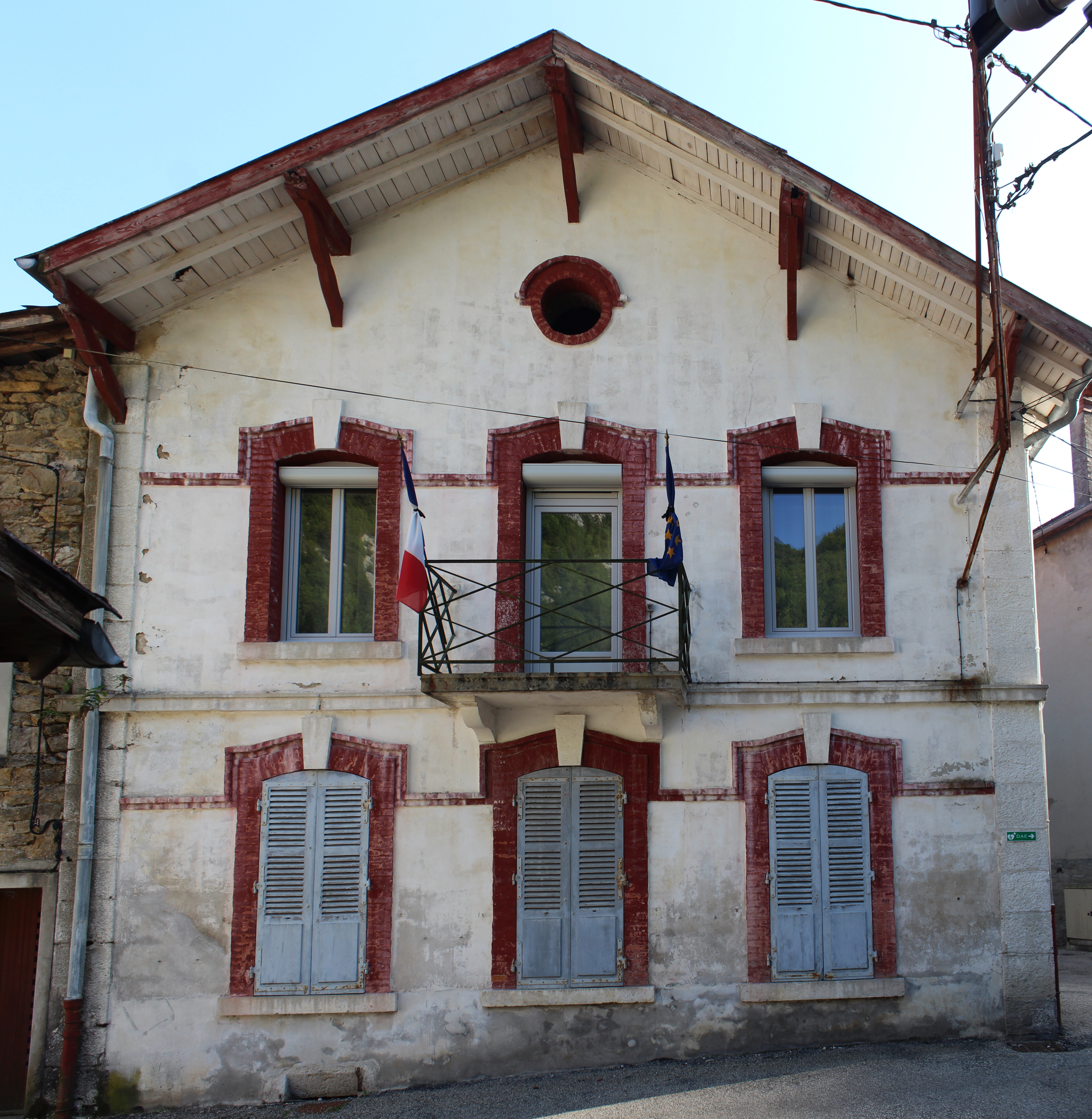
- Town hall
- Location of Chaley
- Location within France Location within Auvergne-Rhône-Alpes
- Coordinates: 45°57′00″N 5°32′00″E
- Country: France
- Region: Auvergne-Rhône-Alpes
- Department: Ain
- Arrondissement: Belley
- Canton: Plateau d'Hauteville
- Intercommunality: Plaine de l'Ain

Government
  - Mayor (2026–32): Mireille Gatta-Martinez
- Area^{1}: 4.6 km^{2} (1.8 sq mi)
- Elevation: 430 m (1,410 ft)
- Highest elevation: 910 m (2,990 ft)
- Lowest elevation: 394 m (1,293 ft)
- Population (2023): 129
  - Density: 28/km^{2} (73/sq mi)
- Time zone: UTC+01:00 (CET)
  - Summer (DST): UTC+02:00 (CEST)
- INSEE/Postal code: 01076 /01230
- ^{1} French Land Register data, which excludes lakes, ponds, glaciers > 1 km^{2} (0.386 sq mi or 247 acres) and river estuaries.

Chaley (French pronunciation: [ʃalɛ]) is a commune in the Ain department in eastern France.

== Geography ==
The river Albarine flows southwestward through the commune; the village lies on its right bank.

== Population ==
Historical population
| Year | Pop. | ±% p.a. |
|---|---|---|
| 1968 | 278 | — |
| 1975 | 171 | −6.71% |
| 1982 | 106 | −6.60% |
| 1990 | 107 | +0.12% |
| 1999 | 106 | −0.10% |
| 2007 | 120 | +1.56% |
| 2012 | 140 | +3.13% |
| 2017 | 130 | −1.47% |
| 2023 | 129 | −0.13% |
Source: INSEE

== See also ==
- Communes of the Ain department
