= Saint-Denis-en-Bugey =

Commune in Auvergne-Rhône-Alpes, France

- Commune
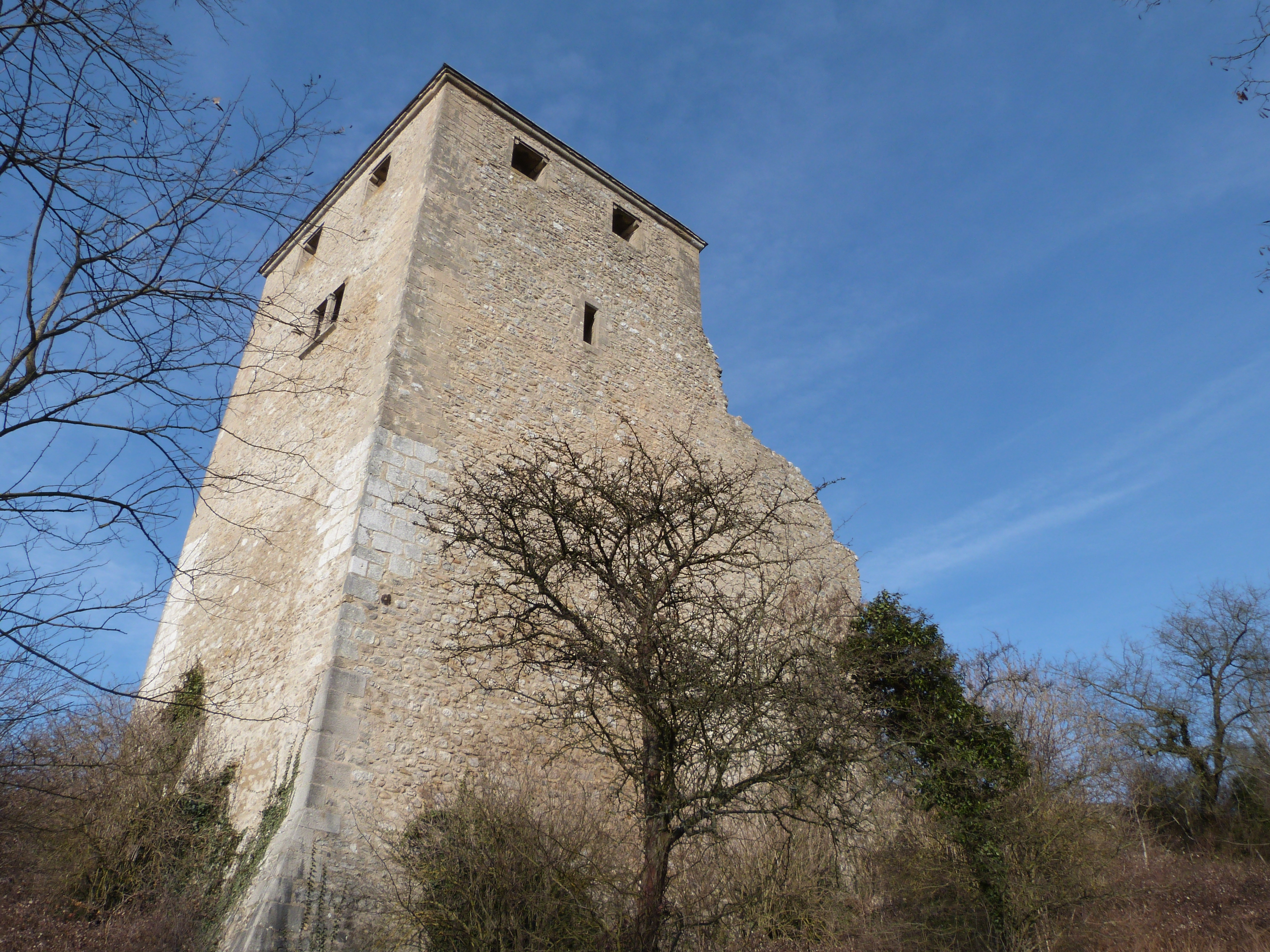
- Chateau

- Coat of arms
- Location of Saint-Denis-en-Bugey
- Location within France Location within Auvergne-Rhône-Alpes
- Coordinates: 45°57′00″N 5°20′00″E
- Country: France
- Region: Auvergne-Rhône-Alpes
- Department: Ain
- Arrondissement: Belley
- Canton: Ambérieu-en-Bugey
- Intercommunality: Plaine de l'Ain

Government
  - Mayor (2026–32): Valérie Cauwet-Delbarre
- Area^{1}: 2.61 km^{2} (1.01 sq mi)
- Elevation: 250 m (820 ft)
- Highest elevation: 338 m (1,109 ft)
- Lowest elevation: 234 m (768 ft)
- Population (2023): 2,246
  - Density: 861/km^{2} (2,230/sq mi)
- Time zone: UTC+01:00 (CET)
  - Summer (DST): UTC+02:00 (CEST)
- INSEE/Postal code: 01345 /01500
- ^{1} French Land Register data, which excludes lakes, ponds, glaciers > 1 km^{2} (0.386 sq mi or 247 acres) and river estuaries.

Saint-Denis-en-Bugey (French pronunciation: [sɛ̃ dəni ɑ̃ byʒɛ]) is a commune in the eastern French department of Ain.

== Geography ==
The town lies on the left bank of the river Albarine, which forms all of the commune's northern border.

== Population ==
Historical population

Year	Pop.	±% p.a.
1793	790	—
1800	454	−7.61%
1806	894	+11.96%
1821	998	+0.74%
1831	1,032	+0.34%
1836	563	−11.41%
1841	505	−2.15%
1846	527	+0.86%
1851	521	−0.23%
1856	513	−0.31%
1861	537	+0.92%
1866	630	+3.25%
1872	602	−0.75%
1876	745	+5.47%
1881	754	+0.24%
1886	788	+0.89%
1891	816	+0.70%
1896	870	+1.29%
1901	916	+1.04%

Year	Pop.	±% p.a.
1906	845	−1.60%
1911	982	+3.05%
1921	1,007	+0.25%
1926	1,058	+0.99%
1931	1,128	+1.29%
1936	1,129	+0.02%
1946	1,131	+0.02%
1954	1,112	−0.21%
1962	1,170	+0.64%
1968	1,200	+0.42%
1975	1,220	+0.24%
1982	1,511	+3.10%
1990	1,780	+2.07%
1999	1,944	+0.98%
2007	2,067	+0.77%
2012	2,178	+1.05%
2017	2,309	+1.17%
2023	2,246	−0.46%

Source: EHESS and INSEE (1968-2023)

== See also ==
- Communes of the Ain department
