= Oncieu =

Commune in Auvergne-Rhône-Alpes, France

- Commune
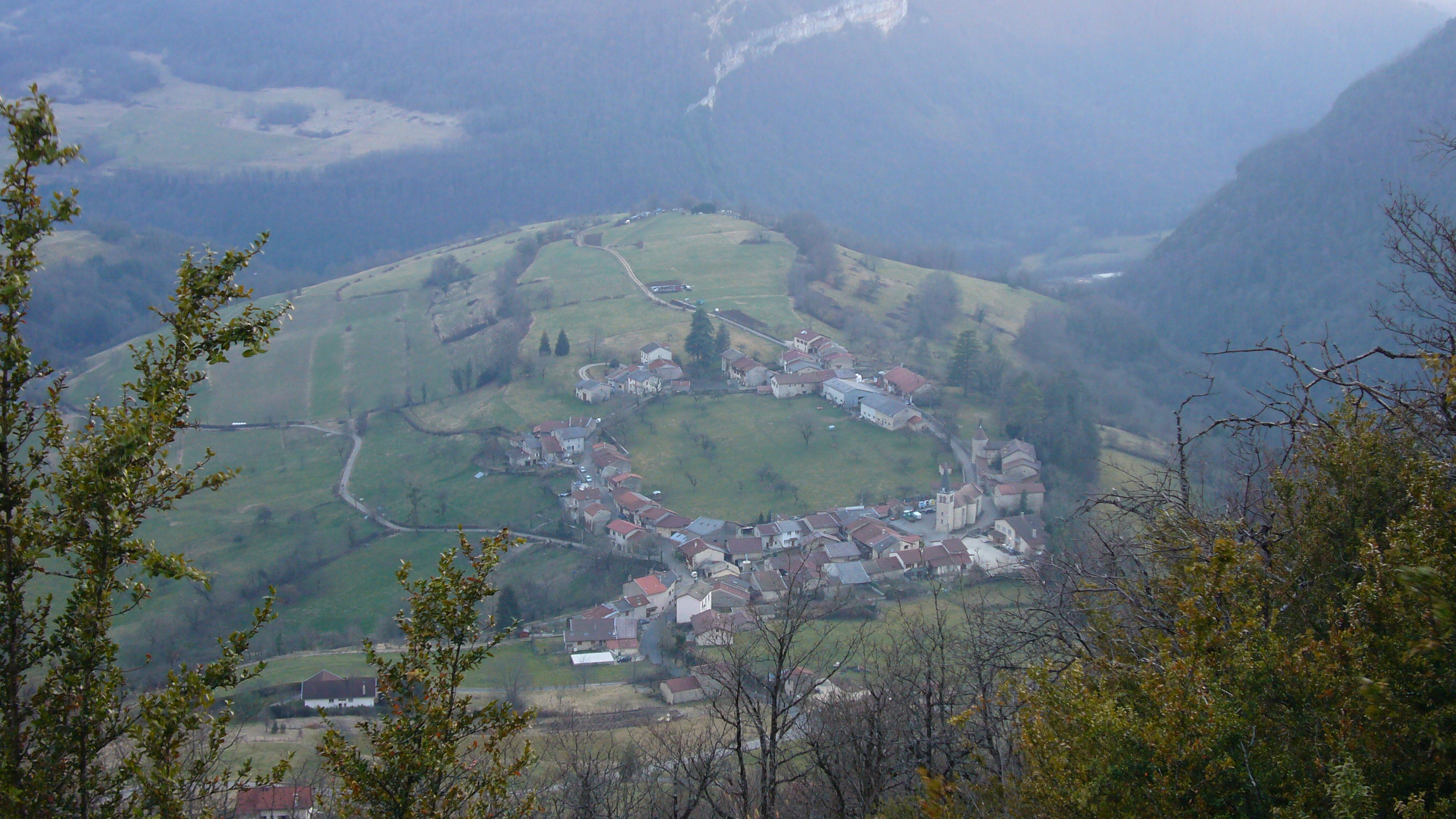

- Coat of arms
- Location of Oncieu
- Location within France Location within Auvergne-Rhône-Alpes
- Coordinates: 45°57′00″N 5°28′00″E
- Country: France
- Region: Auvergne-Rhône-Alpes
- Department: Ain
- Arrondissement: Belley
- Canton: Ambérieu-en-Bugey
- Intercommunality: Plaine de l'Ain

Government
  - Mayor (2026–32): Denis Jacquemin
- Area^{1}: 7.76 km^{2} (3.00 sq mi)
- Elevation: 455 m (1,493 ft)
- Highest elevation: 807 m (2,648 ft)
- Lowest elevation: 300 m (980 ft)
- Population (2023): 72
  - Density: 9.3/km^{2} (24/sq mi)
- Time zone: UTC+01:00 (CET)
  - Summer (DST): UTC+02:00 (CEST)
- INSEE/Postal code: 01279 /01230
- ^{1} French Land Register data, which excludes lakes, ponds, glaciers > 1 km^{2} (0.386 sq mi or 247 acres) and river estuaries.

Oncieu (French pronunciation: [ɔ̃sjø]) is a commune in the Ain department and the Auvergne-Rhône-Alpes region in eastern France. Residents of Oncieu are called Onciolans

== Geography ==
The river Albarine forms most of the commune's southern border.

== Population ==
Historical population
Year	Pop.	±% p.a.
1968	63	—
1975	60	−0.69%
1982	63	+0.70%
1990	68	+0.96%
1999	78	+1.54%
2007	91	+1.95%
2012	95	+0.86%
2017	89	−1.30%
2023	72	−3.47%
Source: INSEE

== See also ==
- Communes of the Ain department
