= Albarine =

River in Eastern France

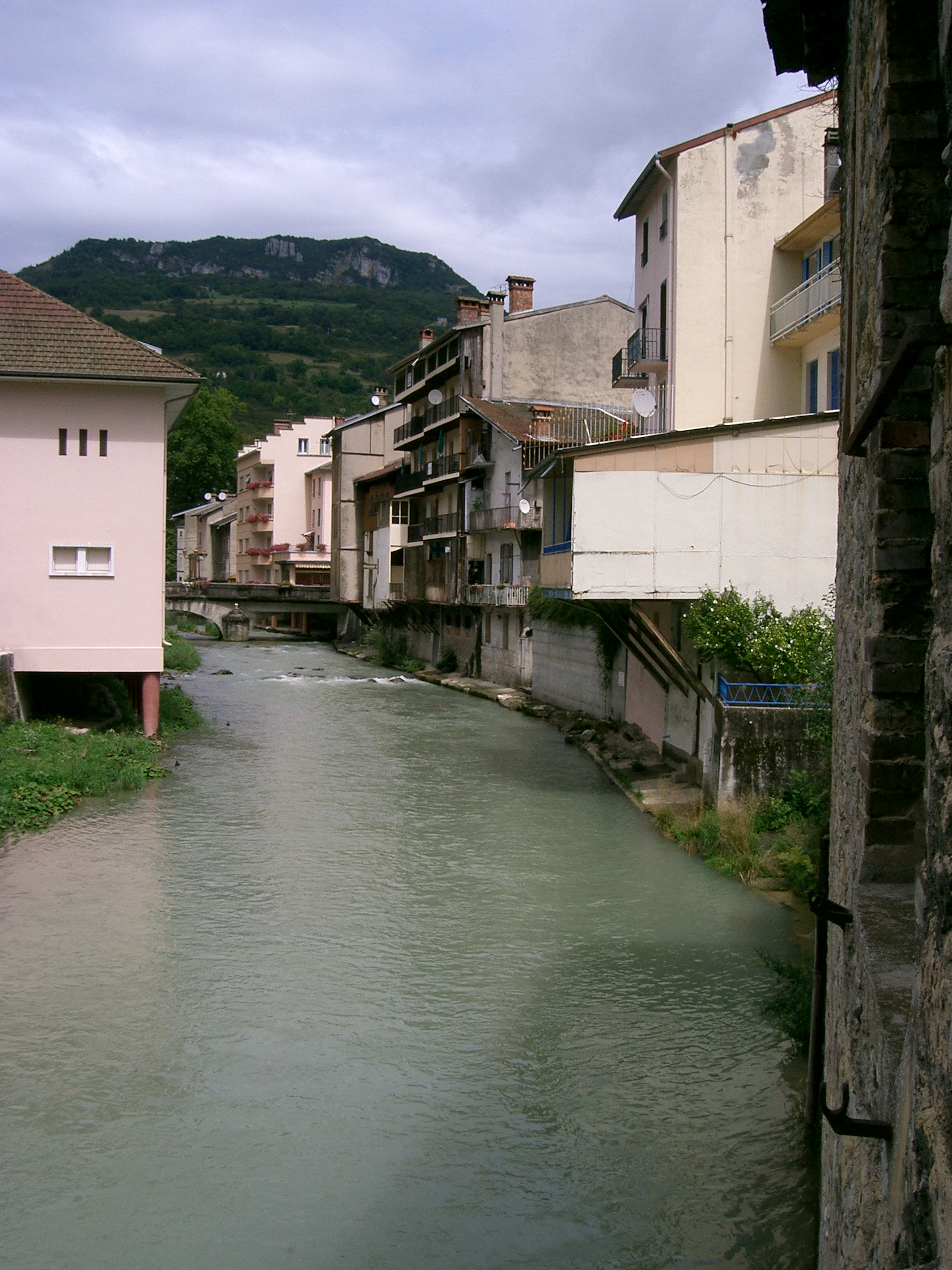
- The Albarine at Tenay

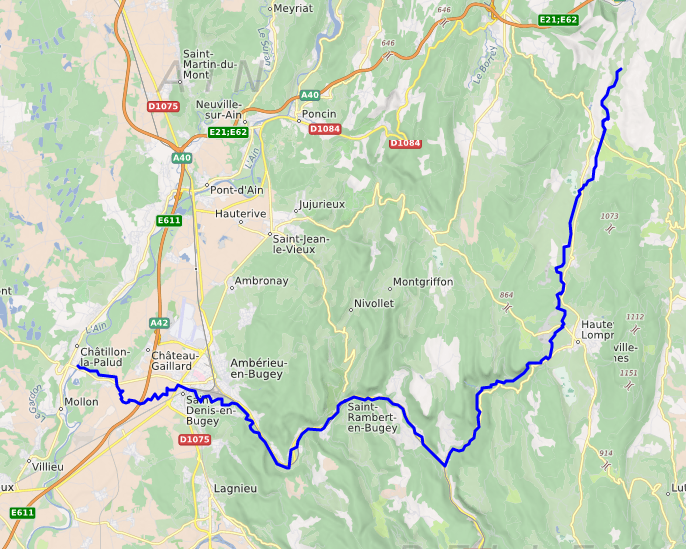

Location
- Country: France

Physical characteristics
- Source
  - location: Brénod
  - coordinates: 46°04′41″N 05°37′07″E
  - elevation: 873 m (2,864 ft)
- Mouth
  - location: Ain
  - coordinates: 45°57′54″N 05°15′27″E
  - elevation: 220 m (720 ft)
- Length: 59.4 km (36.9 mi)
- Basin size: 312 km^{2} (120 sq mi)
- Discharge
  - average: 6.91 m^{3}/s (244 cu ft/s)

Basin features
- Progression: Ain→ Rhône→ Mediterranean Sea

The Albarine (French pronunciation: [albaʁin]) is a 59.4 km (36.9 mi) long river in the Ain department in Eastern France. Its source is at Brénod. It flows generally southwest. It is a left tributary of the Ain, into which it flows at Châtillon-la-Palud, 40 km (25 mi) northeast of Lyon.

== Communes along its course ==
This list is ordered from source to mouth:

- Ain: Brénod, Corcelles, Champdor, Hauteville-Lompnes, Chaley, Tenay, Argis, Oncieu, Saint-Rambert-en-Bugey, Torcieu, Bettant, Ambérieu-en-Bugey, Saint-Denis-en-Bugey, Château-Gaillard, Leyment, Saint-Maurice-de-Rémens, Châtillon-la-Palud
