= Conand, Ain =

Commune in Auvergne-Rhône-Alpes, France

Conand
- Commune
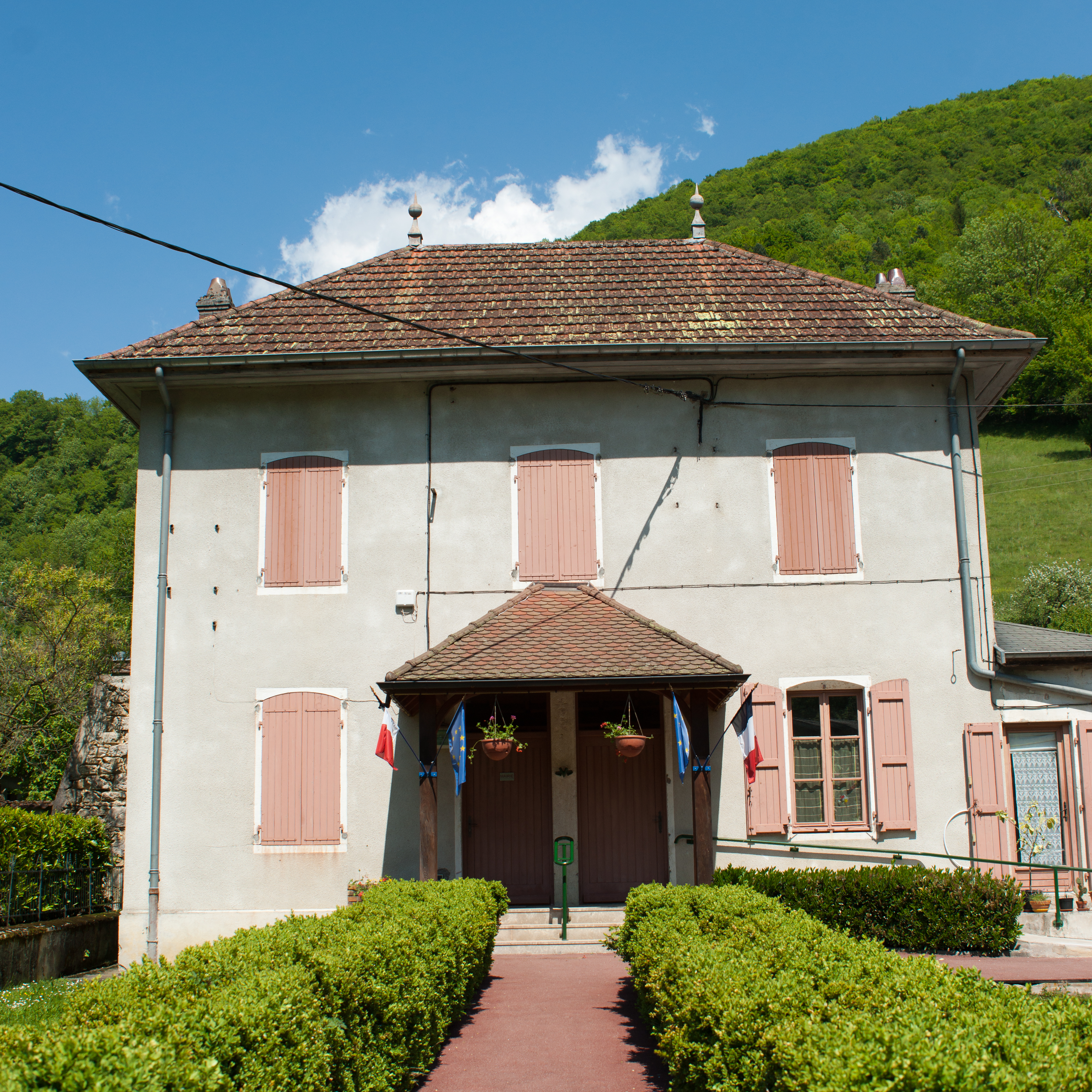
- Town hall
- Location of Conand
- Location within France Location within Auvergne-Rhône-Alpes
- Coordinates: 45°53′00″N 5°28′00″E
- Country: France
- Region: Auvergne-Rhône-Alpes
- Department: Ain
- Arrondissement: Belley
- Canton: Ambérieu-en-Bugey
- Intercommunality: Plaine de l'Ain

Government
  - Mayor (2026–32): Françoise Garibian
- Area^{1}: 15.28 km^{2} (5.90 sq mi)
- Elevation: 360 m (1,180 ft)
- Highest elevation: 1,021 m (3,350 ft)
- Lowest elevation: 351 m (1,152 ft)
- Population (2023): 134
  - Density: 8.77/km^{2} (22.7/sq mi)
- Time zone: UTC+01:00 (CET)
  - Summer (DST): UTC+02:00 (CEST)
- INSEE/Postal code: 01111 /01230
- ^{1} French Land Register data, which excludes lakes, ponds, glaciers > 1 km^{2} (0.386 sq mi or 247 acres) and river estuaries.

Conand (French pronunciation: [kɔnɑ̃]) is a commune in the Ain department in eastern France.

== Population ==
Historical population
| Year | Pop. | ±% p.a. |
|---|---|---|
| 1968 | 90 | — |
| 1975 | 70 | −3.53% |
| 1982 | 91 | +3.82% |
| 1990 | 56 | −5.89% |
| 1999 | 69 | +2.35% |
| 2007 | 104 | +5.26% |
| 2012 | 107 | +0.57% |
| 2017 | 124 | +2.99% |
| 2023 | 134 | +1.30% |
Source: INSEE

== See also ==
- Communes of the Ain department
