= Saint-Rambert-en-Bugey =

Commune in Auvergne-Rhône-Alpes, France

- Commune
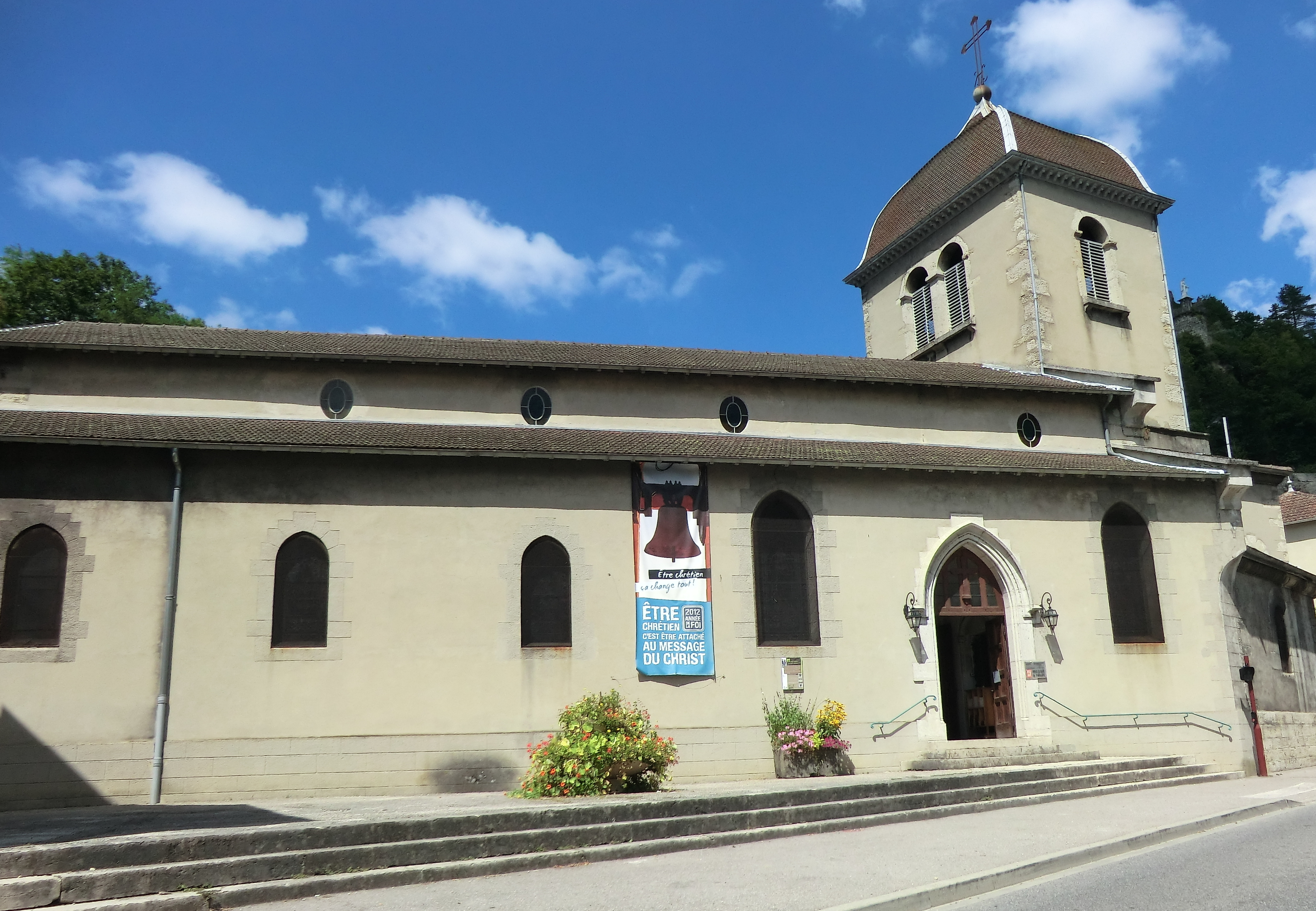

- Coat of arms
- Location of Saint-Rambert-en-Bugey
- Location within France Location within Auvergne-Rhône-Alpes
- Coordinates: 45°57′00″N 5°26′00″E
- Country: France
- Region: Auvergne-Rhône-Alpes
- Department: Ain
- Arrondissement: Belley
- Canton: Ambérieu-en-Bugey

Government
  - Mayor (2026–32): Florence Reisser
- Area^{1}: 28.55 km^{2} (11.02 sq mi)
- Elevation: 290 m (950 ft)
- Highest elevation: 819 m (2,687 ft)
- Lowest elevation: 271 m (889 ft)
- Population (2023): 2,190
  - Density: 76.7/km^{2} (199/sq mi)
- Time zone: UTC+01:00 (CET)
  - Summer (DST): UTC+02:00 (CEST)
- INSEE/Postal code: 01384 /01230
- ^{1} French Land Register data, which excludes lakes, ponds, glaciers > 1 km^{2} (0.386 sq mi or 247 acres) and river estuaries.

Saint-Rambert-en-Bugey (French pronunciation: [sɛ̃ ʁɑ̃bɛʁ ɑ̃ byʒɛ], lit. 'Saint Rambert in Bugey') is a commune in the Ain department in eastern France.

== History ==
The commune takes its name from St Rambert (or Ragnebert) who was assassinated here in the 7th century. The site soon became popular for pilgrimage and an influential abbey was built in the town.

== Geography ==
The river Albarine flows southwest through the commune. Saint-Rambert-en-Bugey station has rail connections to Lyon, Ambérieu-en-Bugey and Chambéry.

=== Climate ===
Saint-Rambert-en-Bugey has an oceanic climate (Köppen climate classification Cfb). The average annual temperature in Saint-Rambert-en-Bugey is 11.4 °C (52.5 °F). The average annual rainfall is 1,512.4 mm (59.54 in) with November as the wettest month. The temperatures are highest on average in July, at around 20.4 °C (68.7 °F), and lowest in January, at around 2.6 °C (36.7 °F). The highest temperature ever recorded in Saint-Rambert-en-Bugey was 39.6 °C (103.3 °F) on 13 August 2003; the coldest temperature ever recorded was −17.0 °C (1.4 °F) on 5 February 2012.

Climate data for Saint-Rambert-en-Bugey (1991–2020 averages, extremes 1991−2020)
| Month | Jan | Feb | Mar | Apr | May | Jun | Jul | Aug | Sep | Oct | Nov | Dec | Year |
|---|---|---|---|---|---|---|---|---|---|---|---|---|---|
| Record high °C (°F) | 16.2 (61.2) | 19.8 (67.6) | 24.3 (75.7) | 29.3 (84.7) | 33.2 (91.8) | 37.5 (99.5) | 39.3 (102.7) | 39.6 (103.3) | 33.0 (91.4) | 27.5 (81.5) | 23.5 (74.3) | 17.7 (63.9) | 39.6 (103.3) |
| Mean daily maximum °C (°F) | 6.0 (42.8) | 8.2 (46.8) | 13.5 (56.3) | 17.4 (63.3) | 21.5 (70.7) | 25.3 (77.5) | 27.6 (81.7) | 27.2 (81.0) | 22.4 (72.3) | 17.1 (62.8) | 10.4 (50.7) | 6.2 (43.2) | 16.9 (62.4) |
| Daily mean °C (°F) | 2.6 (36.7) | 3.8 (38.8) | 7.5 (45.5) | 11.0 (51.8) | 14.9 (58.8) | 18.4 (65.1) | 20.4 (68.7) | 20.1 (68.2) | 16.1 (61.0) | 12.1 (53.8) | 6.7 (44.1) | 3.2 (37.8) | 11.4 (52.5) |
| Mean daily minimum °C (°F) | −0.7 (30.7) | −0.7 (30.7) | 1.6 (34.9) | 4.6 (40.3) | 8.4 (47.1) | 11.5 (52.7) | 13.2 (55.8) | 12.9 (55.2) | 9.8 (49.6) | 7.1 (44.8) | 2.9 (37.2) | 0.2 (32.4) | 5.9 (42.6) |
| Record low °C (°F) | −14.5 (5.9) | −17.0 (1.4) | −15.5 (4.1) | −5.0 (23.0) | −1.2 (29.8) | 1.3 (34.3) | 4.0 (39.2) | 3.6 (38.5) | 0.0 (32.0) | −6.0 (21.2) | −10.0 (14.0) | −16.0 (3.2) | −17.0 (1.4) |
| Average precipitation mm (inches) | 134.0 (5.28) | 114.0 (4.49) | 112.1 (4.41) | 123.0 (4.84) | 134.7 (5.30) | 104.8 (4.13) | 107.6 (4.24) | 98.5 (3.88) | 128.3 (5.05) | 151.3 (5.96) | 159.4 (6.28) | 144.7 (5.70) | 1,512.4 (59.54) |
| Average precipitation days (≥ 1.0 mm) | 12.4 | 10.7 | 11.6 | 10.8 | 12.3 | 10.0 | 9.1 | 8.5 | 9.3 | 12.2 | 12.2 | 13.3 | 132.3 |
Source: Meteociel

== Population ==
Historical population

| Year | Pop. | ±% p.a. |
|---|---|---|
| 1793 | 2,042 | — |
| 1800 | 2,596 | +3.49% |
| 1806 | 2,244 | −2.40% |
| 1821 | 2,130 | −0.35% |
| 1831 | 2,420 | +1.28% |
| 1836 | 2,613 | +1.55% |
| 1841 | 2,633 | +0.15% |
| 1846 | 2,567 | −0.51% |
| 1851 | 2,528 | −0.31% |
| 1856 | 2,799 | +2.06% |
| 1861 | 2,597 | −1.49% |
| 1866 | 2,531 | −0.51% |
| 1872 | 2,537 | +0.04% |
| 1876 | 2,620 | +0.81% |
| 1881 | 2,964 | +2.50% |
| 1886 | 3,409 | +2.84% |
| 1891 | 3,765 | +2.01% |
| 1896 | 4,113 | +1.78% |
| 1901 | 5,028 | +4.10% |

| Year | Pop. | ±% p.a. |
|---|---|---|
| 1906 | 4,971 | −0.23% |
| 1911 | 4,950 | −0.08% |
| 1921 | 4,204 | −1.62% |
| 1926 | 4,319 | +0.54% |
| 1931 | 4,168 | −0.71% |
| 1936 | 3,463 | −3.64% |
| 1946 | 2,862 | −1.89% |
| 1954 | 2,866 | +0.02% |
| 1962 | 2,936 | +0.30% |
| 1968 | 2,857 | −0.45% |
| 1975 | 2,439 | −2.23% |
| 1982 | 2,161 | −1.71% |
| 1990 | 2,112 | −0.29% |
| 1999 | 2,065 | −0.25% |
| 2007 | 2,167 | +0.60% |
| 2012 | 2,216 | +0.45% |
| 2017 | 2,269 | +0.47% |
| 2023 | 2,190 | −0.59% |

Source: EHESS and INSEE (1968-2023)

== See also ==
- Communes of the Ain department
