= List of lakes of Ain, France =

This is a list of lakes in the Ain department on the eastern edge of France.

- Lac de Barterand, a lake in Pollieu
- Lac de Chailloux, a small lake at Contrevoz
- Lac de Chavoley, a lake at Ceyzérieu
- Lac de Coiselet, a reservoir
- Lac de Conflans, a lake at the confluence of the rivers Ain and Valouse
- Lacs de Conzieu, a group of three small lakes at Conzieu
- Lac de Crotel, a lake at Groslée
- Lac de Divonne, an artificial lake at Divonne-les-Bains
- Lac de Glandieu
- Lacs des Hôpitaux, a pair of lakes at La Burbanche
- Lac de Morgnieu, a lake at Ceyzérieu
- Lac de Nantua, a lake located between Nantua, Montreal-la-Cluse, and Port
- Lac de Sylans, a lake at Le Poizat
- Lac de Virieu, a lake at Virieu-le-Grand
- Lac Genin, a lake fed by underground sources
