= Andert-et-Condon =

Commune in Auvergne-Rhône-Alpes, France

- Commune
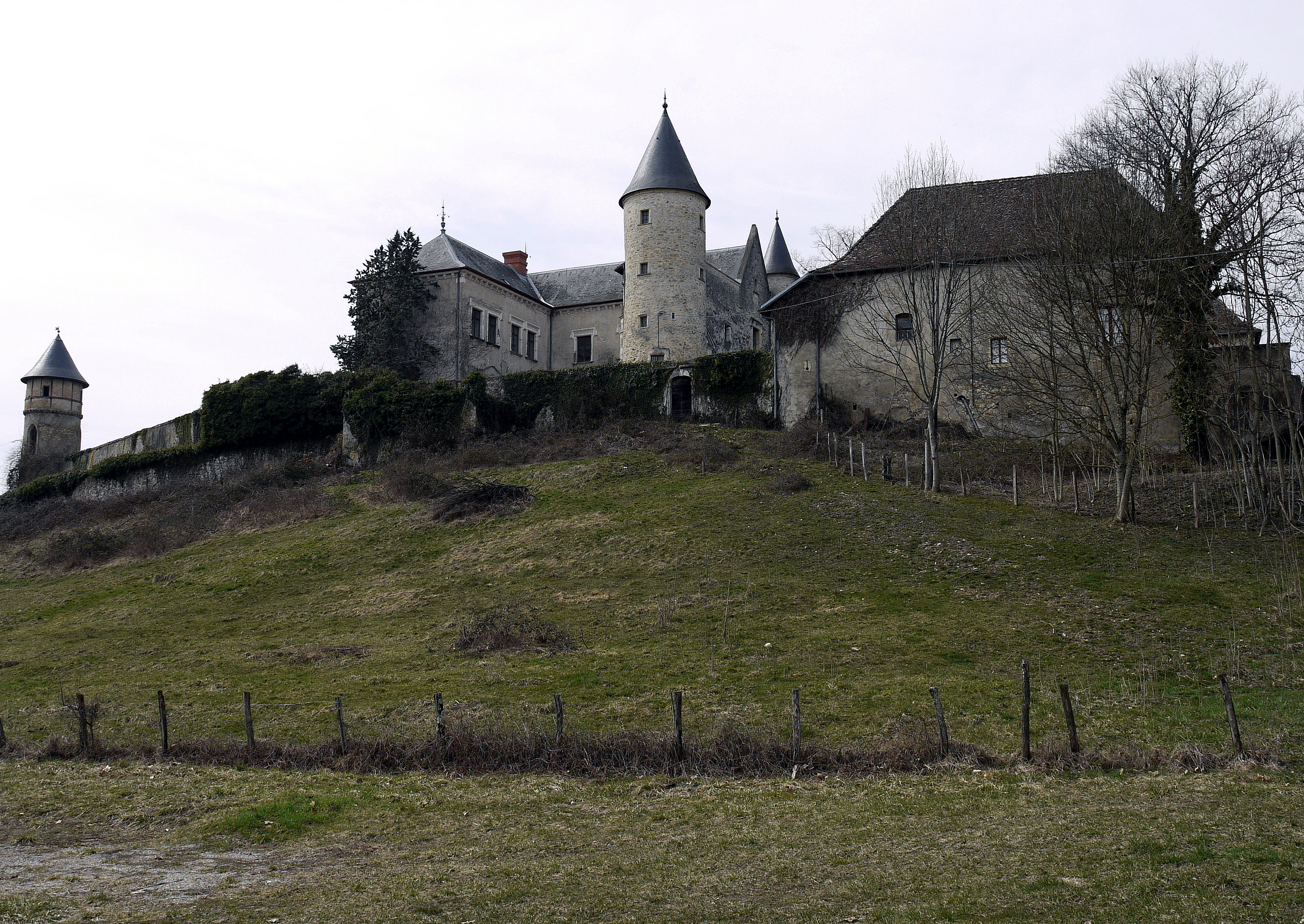
- Castle of Andert
- Location of Andert-et-Condon
- Location within France Location within Auvergne-Rhône-Alpes
- Coordinates: 45°47′43″N 5°39′21″E
- Country: France
- Region: Auvergne-Rhône-Alpes
- Department: Ain
- Arrondissement: Belley
- Canton: Belley
- Intercommunality: Bugey Sud

Government
  - Mayor (2026–32): Patrick Guillermin
- Area^{1}: 6.94 km^{2} (2.68 sq mi)
- Elevation: 295 m (968 ft)
- Highest elevation: 374 m (1,227 ft)
- Lowest elevation: 225 m (738 ft)
- Population (2023): 348
  - Density: 50.1/km^{2} (130/sq mi)
- Time zone: UTC+01:00 (CET)
  - Summer (DST): UTC+02:00 (CEST)
- INSEE/Postal code: 01009 /01300
- ^{1} French Land Register data, which excludes lakes, ponds, glaciers > 1 km^{2} (0.386 sq mi or 247 acres) and river estuaries.

Andert-et-Condon (French pronunciation: [ɑ̃dɛʁ e kɔ̃dɔ̃]) is a commune in the department of Ain in the Auvergne-Rhône-Alpes region of central-eastern France.

== Geography ==
Located 6 km north-west of Belley (a sub-prefecture of Ain) and 40 km south-west of Amberieu-en-Bugey, Andert-et-Condon is a commune of 694 hectares. It is watered by the Furans. In addition to the village, the commune has several hamlets: Gevrin, Andert, and les Barraques et Bognens. The commune can be accessed by the D83 road from Contrevoz in the north-west which passes through the village continuing east to join the D1504 from Chazey-Bons to Belley. The D32 also passes through Contrevoz then passes through the south of the commune to Belley. the D32A comes from the north and through the village linking with the D32 in the south of the commune. The commune is mostly forest with some areas of farmland.

The town lies within the Appellation d'origine contrôlée (AOC) zone for the wines of Bugey.

== History ==
The area has been inhabited since the Chalcolithic and Roman periods. Excavations have found neolithic pottery. From 1180 to 1829 the Lordship of Andert played an important role in the region (the Dukes of Savoy - King of France). The tomb of François Andert Parra, provost of the constabulary of Bugey, is in the Andert chapel. This chapel dates from the 13th century with a stone dated from the 1st century. Andert and Condon were merged in 1791. Andert castle and Beauregard Manor overlook the road down to Contrevoz on the Furans. In 1838 on Andert bridge there was the mysterious drama of the Sébastien Benoit Peytel case which was defended by Balzac, Lamartine, and Gavarni.

== Administration ==
List of Successive Mayors of Andert-et-Condons

From	To	Name
1995	2016	Yves Delaruelle
2016	2020	Francine Martinat
2020	Incumbent	Patrick Guillermin

== Population ==
Historical population
Year	Pop.	±% p.a.
1968	159	—
1975	184	+2.11%
1982	276	+5.96%
1990	262	−0.65%
1999	275	+0.54%
2007	325	+2.11%
2012	338	+0.79%
2017	330	−0.48%
2023	348	+0.89%
Source: INSEE

== Sights ==
The commune has two sites which are registered as historical monuments:

- The Chateau of Andert (15th century)
- The Chateau of Andert Park
- At the south-eastern tip of the commune is the Pont de Bognens medieval bridge across the Furans river dating from 1290.

== See also ==
- Communes of the Ain department
- List of medieval bridges in France
