= Cuzieu =

Cuzieu may refer to two Communes of France:

- Cuzieu, Ain
- Cuzieu, Loire
