= Brens =

Brens is the name of several communes in France:

- Brens, Ain, in the Ain département
- Brens, Tarn, in the Tarn département
