= Massignieu-de-Rives =

Commune in Auvergne-Rhône-Alpes, France

- Commune
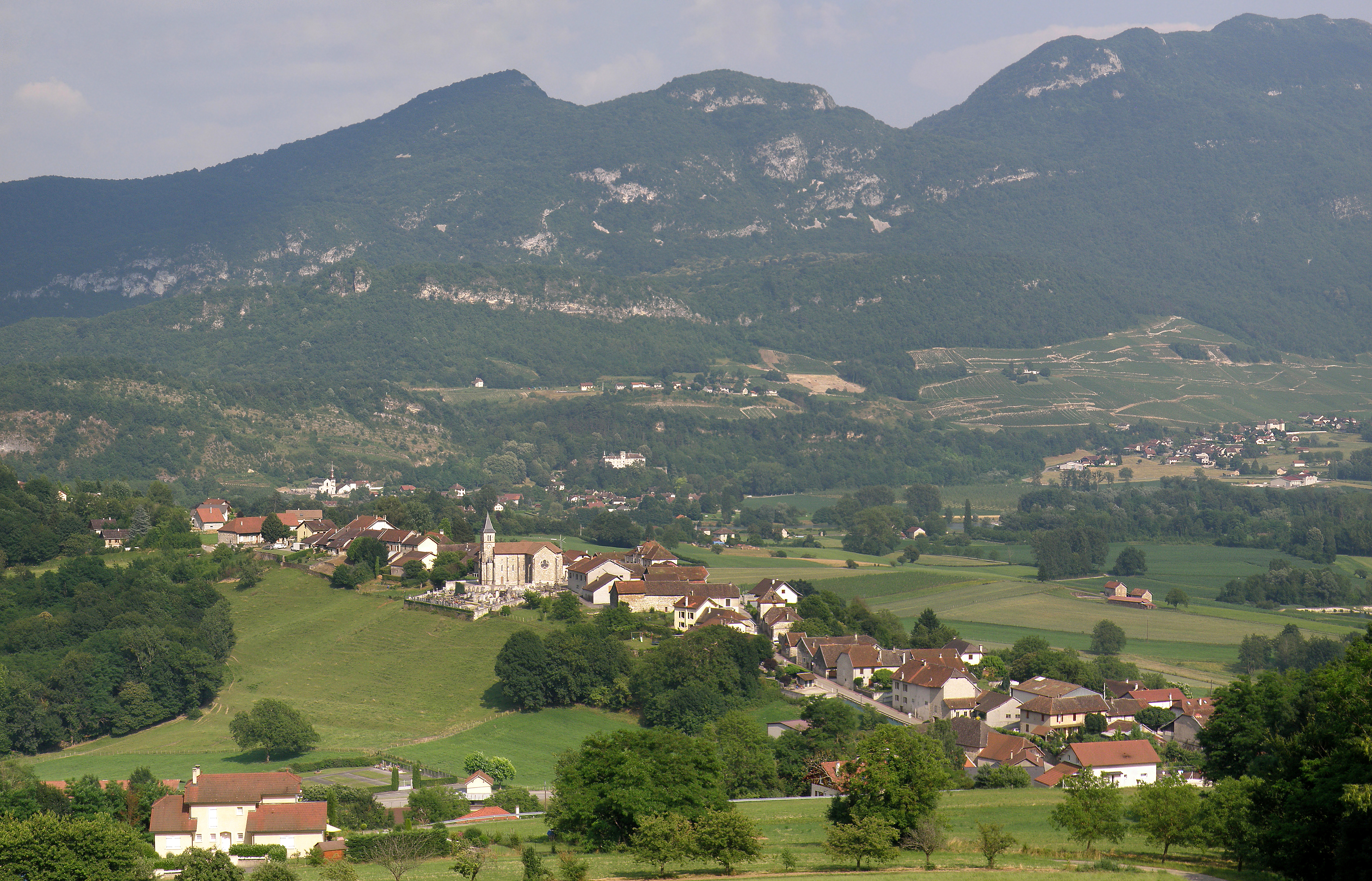
- Location of Massignieu-de-Rives
- Location within France Location within Auvergne-Rhône-Alpes
- Coordinates: 45°45′00″N 5°46′00″E
- Country: France
- Region: Auvergne-Rhône-Alpes
- Department: Ain
- Arrondissement: Belley
- Canton: Belley

Government
  - Mayor (2026–32): Didier Vinette
- Area^{1}: 9.52 km^{2} (3.68 sq mi)
- Elevation: 270 m (890 ft)
- Highest elevation: 494 m (1,621 ft)
- Lowest elevation: 220 m (720 ft)
- Population (2023): 650
  - Density: 68/km^{2} (180/sq mi)
- Time zone: UTC+01:00 (CET)
  - Summer (DST): UTC+02:00 (CEST)
- INSEE/Postal code: 01239 /01300
- ^{1} French Land Register data, which excludes lakes, ponds, glaciers > 1 km^{2} (0.386 sq mi or 247 acres) and river estuaries.

Massignieu-de-Rives (French pronunciation: [masiɲø də ʁiv]) is a commune in the Ain department in eastern France.

== Population ==
Historical population
Year	Pop.	±% p.a.
1968	323	—
1975	305	−0.82%
1982	404	+4.10%
1990	412	+0.25%
1999	498	+2.13%
2007	567	+1.64%
2012	628	+2.06%
2017	614	−0.45%
2023	650	+0.95%
Source: INSEE

== See also ==
- Communes of the Ain department
