= Colomieu =

Commune in Auvergne-Rhône-Alpes, France

- Commune
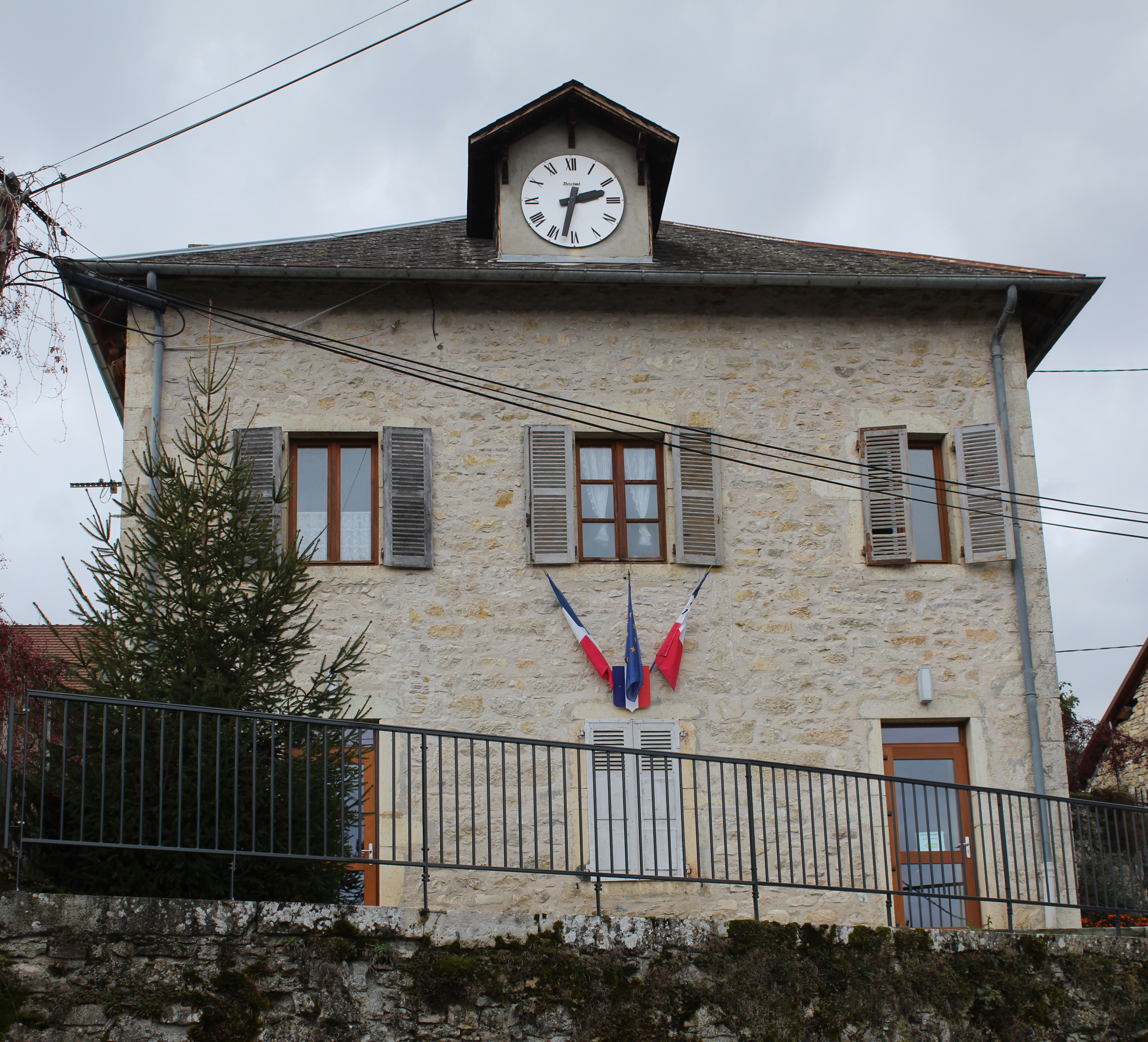
- Town hall
- Location of Colomieu
- Location within France Location within Auvergne-Rhône-Alpes
- Coordinates: 45°44′00″N 5°37′00″E
- Country: France
- Region: Auvergne-Rhône-Alpes
- Department: Ain
- Arrondissement: Belley
- Canton: Belley
- Intercommunality: Bugey Sud

Government
  - Mayor (2026–32): Gilles Borgey
- Area^{1}: 5.96 km^{2} (2.30 sq mi)
- Elevation: 326 m (1,070 ft)
- Highest elevation: 476 m (1,562 ft)
- Lowest elevation: 319 m (1,047 ft)
- Population (2023): 159
  - Density: 26.7/km^{2} (69.1/sq mi)
- Time zone: UTC+01:00 (CET)
  - Summer (DST): UTC+02:00 (CEST)
- INSEE/Postal code: 01110 /01300
- ^{1} French Land Register data, which excludes lakes, ponds, glaciers > 1 km^{2} (0.386 sq mi or 247 acres) and river estuaries.

Colomieu (French pronunciation: [kɔlɔmjø]) is a commune in the Ain department in eastern France.

== Population ==
Historical population
Year	Pop.	±% p.a.
1968	98	—
1975	97	−0.15%
1982	122	+3.33%
1990	114	−0.84%
1999	128	+1.30%
2007	117	−1.12%
2012	118	+0.17%
2017	140	+3.48%
2023	159	+2.14%
Source: INSEE

== See also ==
- Communes of the Ain department
