= Lac d'Armaille =

Lake in France

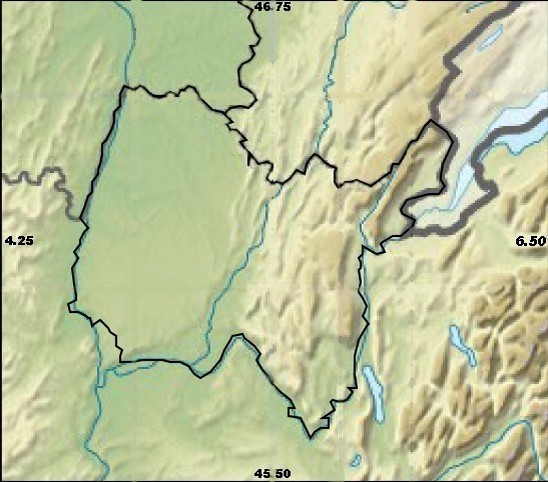
- Location within Ain
- Location: Ain
- Coordinates: 45°45′33″N 5°38′13″E
- Basin countries: France

Lac d'Armaille is a lake at Saint-Germain-les-Paroisses in the Ain department of France.
