= Lac de Crotel =

Lake in France

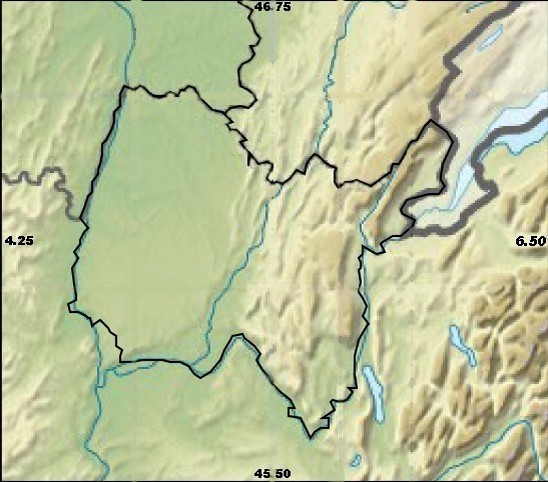
- Location within Ain
- Location: Ain
- Coordinates: 45°43′28″N 5°35′26″E
- Basin countries: France

Lac de Crotel is a lake at Groslée in the Ain department in the region of Auvergne-Rhône-Alpes, France.

== Geography ==
Lac de Crotel has an altitude of 535 meters and is situated in the Montagne de Tentanet at the bottom of a combe. The neighboring lakes are the Lacs de Conzieu and the Lac d'Armaille.

== Ecology ==
Lac de Crotel is a ZNIEFF type I, with an area of 8.17 hectares.
