= Cressin-Rochefort =

Commune in Auvergne-Rhône-Alpes, France

- Commune
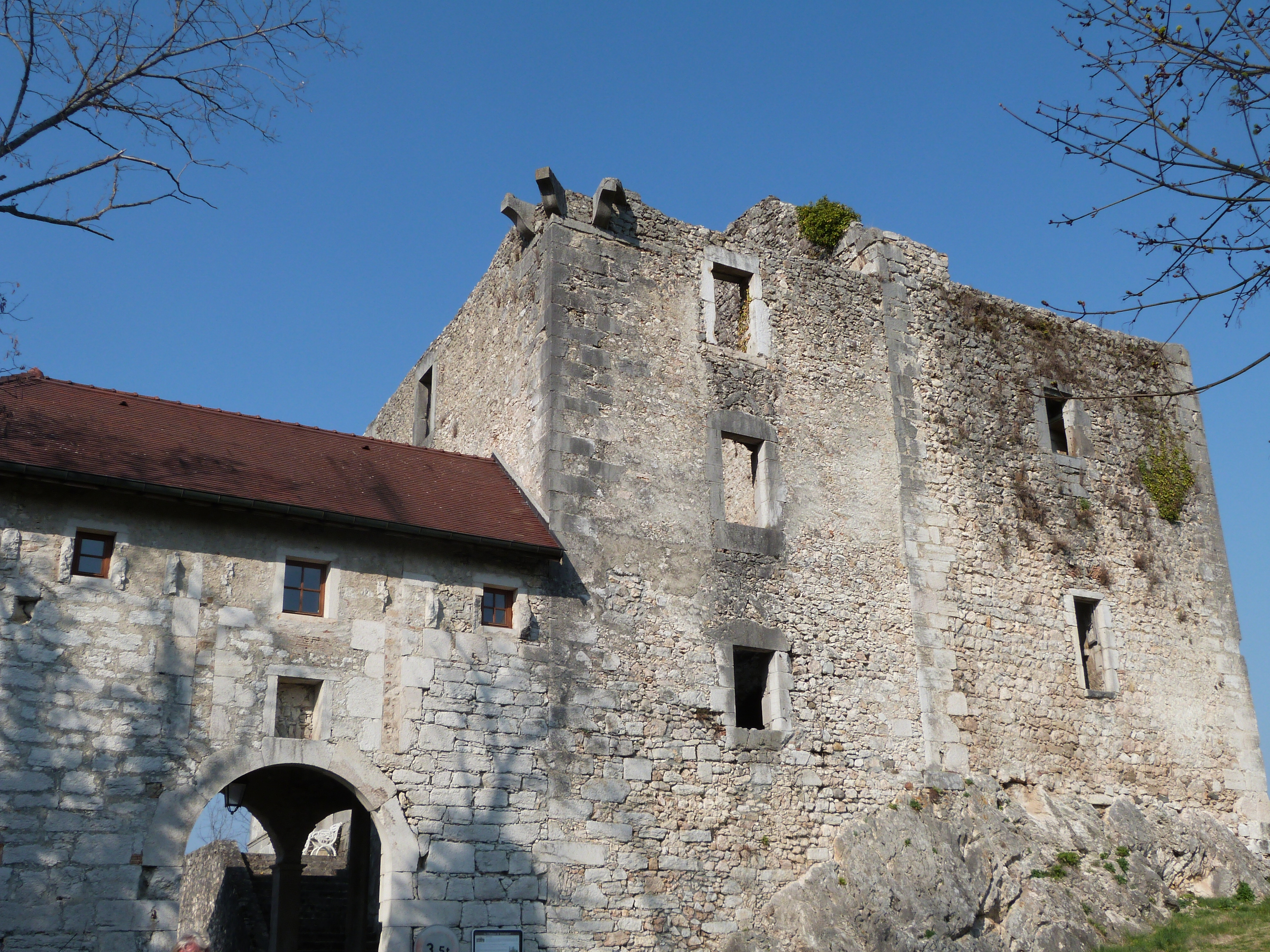
- Chateau of Rochefort sur Séran
- Location of Cressin-Rochefort
- Location within France Location within Auvergne-Rhône-Alpes
- Coordinates: 45°46′34″N 5°45′36″E
- Country: France
- Region: Auvergne-Rhône-Alpes
- Department: Ain
- Arrondissement: Belley
- Canton: Belley

Government
  - Mayor (2026–32): Leatitia Biasini
- Area^{1}: 7.93 km^{2} (3.06 sq mi)
- Elevation: 230 m (750 ft)
- Highest elevation: 554 m (1,818 ft)
- Lowest elevation: 225 m (738 ft)
- Population (2023): 380
  - Density: 48/km^{2} (120/sq mi)
- Time zone: UTC+01:00 (CET)
  - Summer (DST): UTC+02:00 (CEST)
- INSEE/Postal code: 01133 /01350
- ^{1} French Land Register data, which excludes lakes, ponds, glaciers > 1 km^{2} (0.386 sq mi or 247 acres) and river estuaries.

Cressin-Rochefort (French pronunciation: [kʁesɛ̃ ʁɔʃfɔʁ]) is a commune in the Ain department in eastern France.

== Population ==
Historical population
| Year | Pop. | ±% p.a. |
|---|---|---|
| 1968 | 166 | — |
| 1975 | 179 | +1.08% |
| 1982 | 216 | +2.72% |
| 1990 | 250 | +1.84% |
| 1999 | 308 | +2.35% |
| 2007 | 355 | +1.79% |
| 2012 | 375 | +1.10% |
| 2017 | 392 | +0.89% |
| 2023 | 380 | −0.52% |
Source: INSEE

== See also ==
- Communes of the Ain department
