= Murs-et-Gélignieux =

Commune in Auvergne-Rhône-Alpes, France

- Commune
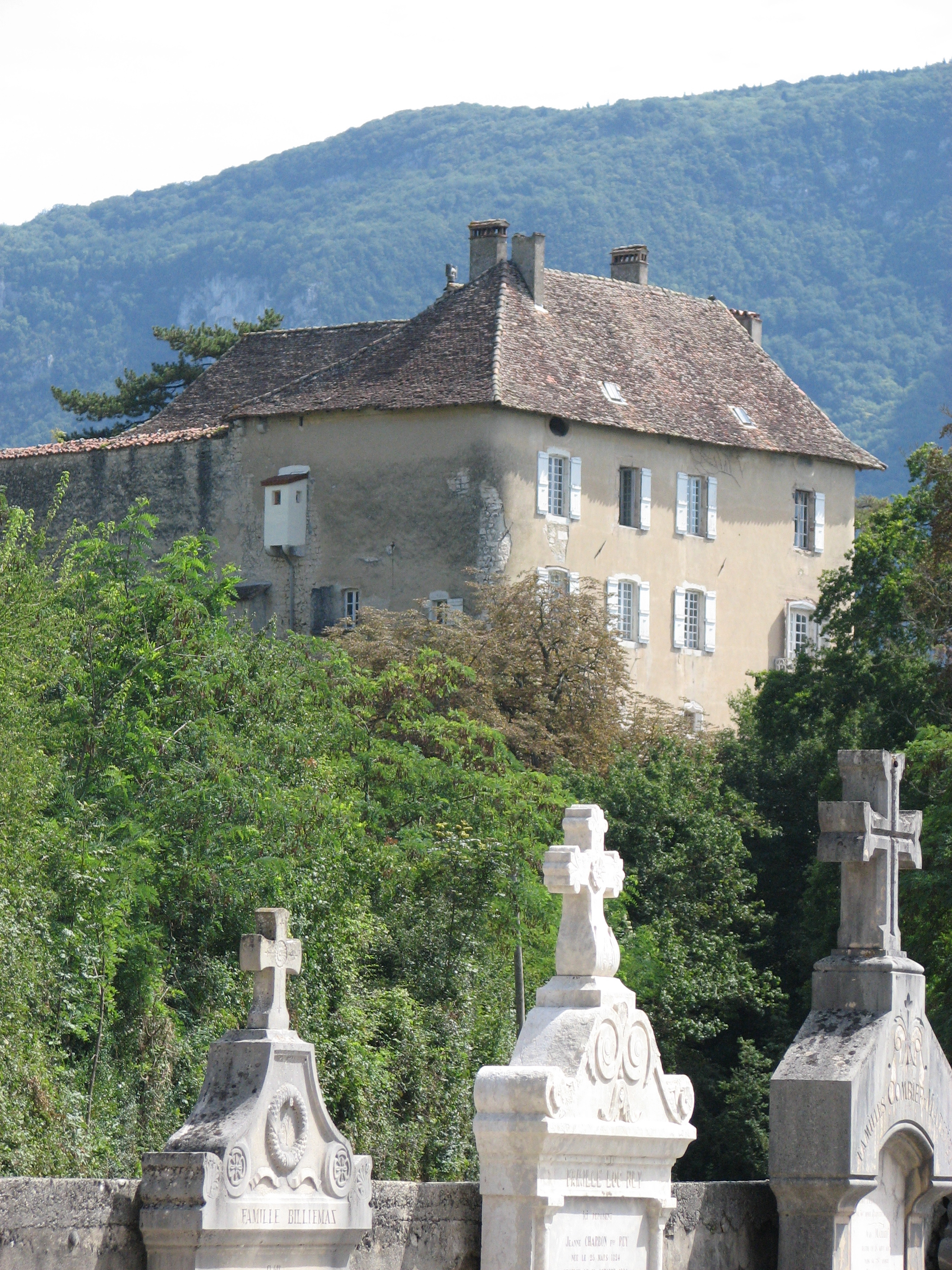
- Chateau
- Location of Murs-et-Gélignieux
- Location within France Location within Auvergne-Rhône-Alpes
- Coordinates: 45°38′00″N 5°40′00″E
- Country: France
- Region: Auvergne-Rhône-Alpes
- Department: Ain
- Arrondissement: Belley
- Canton: Belley

Government
  - Mayor (2026–32): Pierre Vallin
- Area^{1}: 6.46 km^{2} (2.49 sq mi)
- Elevation: 218 m (715 ft)
- Highest elevation: 460 m (1,510 ft)
- Lowest elevation: 210 m (690 ft)
- Population (2023): 239
  - Density: 37.0/km^{2} (95.8/sq mi)
- Time zone: UTC+01:00 (CET)
  - Summer (DST): UTC+02:00 (CEST)
- INSEE/Postal code: 01268 /01300
- ^{1} French Land Register data, which excludes lakes, ponds, glaciers > 1 km^{2} (0.386 sq mi or 247 acres) and river estuaries.

Murs-et-Gélignieux (French pronunciation: [myʁ e ʒeliɲø]) is a commune in the Ain department in eastern France.

== Population ==
Historical population
Year	Pop.	±% p.a.
1968	127	—
1975	131	+0.44%
1982	121	−1.13%
1990	188	+5.66%
1999	204	+0.91%
2007	239	+2.00%
2012	248	+0.74%
2017	252	+0.32%
2023	239	−0.88%
Source: INSEE

== See also ==
- Communes of the Ain department
