= Lavours =

Commune in Auvergne-Rhône-Alpes, France

- Commune
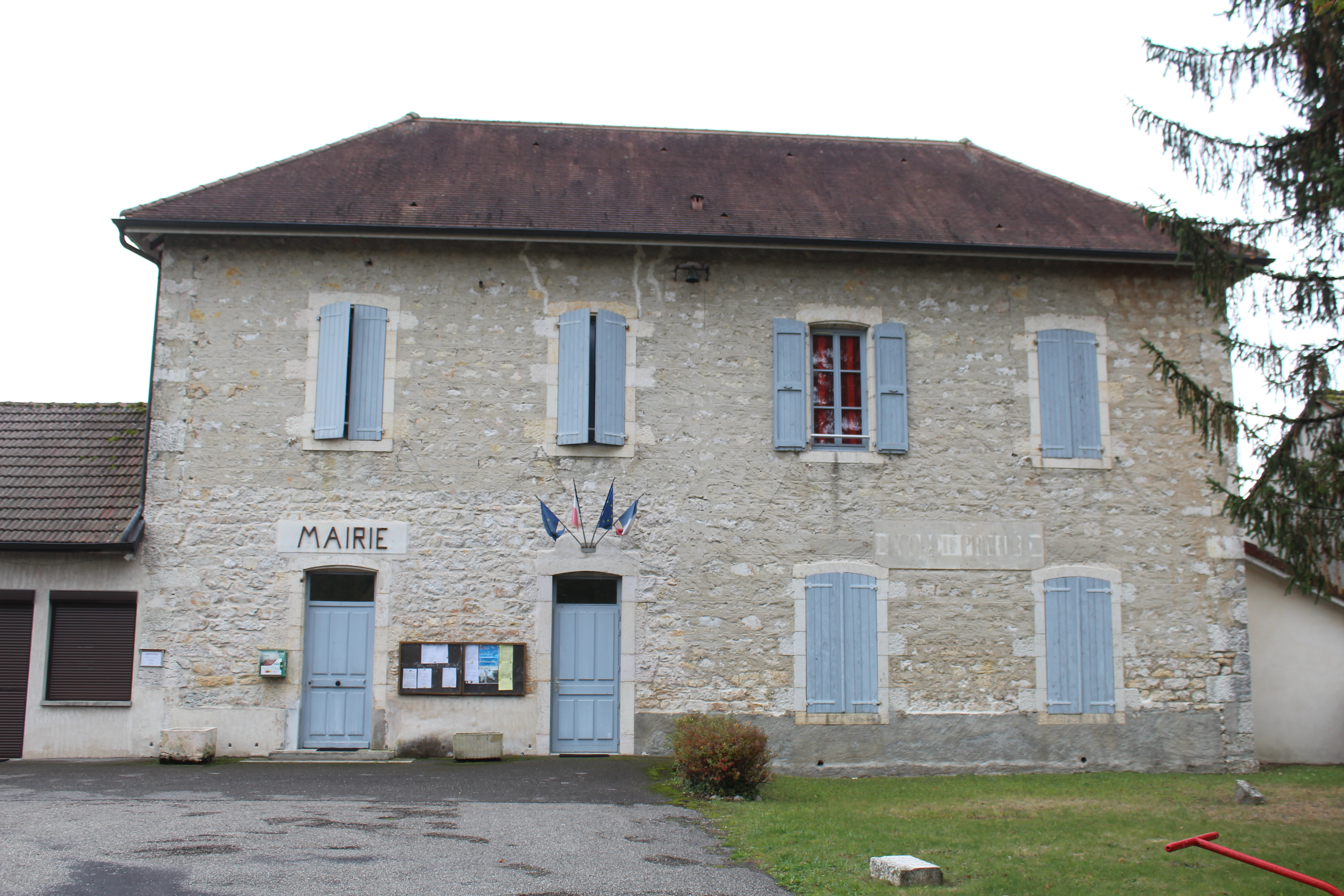
- Town hall
- Location of Lavours
- Location within France Location within Auvergne-Rhône-Alpes
- Coordinates: 45°48′36″N 5°46′23″E
- Country: France
- Region: Auvergne-Rhône-Alpes
- Department: Ain
- Arrondissement: Belley
- Canton: Belley

Government
  - Mayor (2026–32): Céline Bouillien
- Area^{1}: 6.30 km^{2} (2.43 sq mi)
- Elevation: 232 m (761 ft)
- Highest elevation: 320 m (1,050 ft)
- Lowest elevation: 224 m (735 ft)
- Population (2023): 138
  - Density: 21.9/km^{2} (56.7/sq mi)
- Time zone: UTC+01:00 (CET)
  - Summer (DST): UTC+02:00 (CEST)
- INSEE/Postal code: 01208 /01350
- ^{1} French Land Register data, which excludes lakes, ponds, glaciers > 1 km^{2} (0.386 sq mi or 247 acres) and river estuaries.

Lavours (French pronunciation: [lavuʁ]) is a commune in the Ain department in eastern France.

== Population ==
Historical population
Year	Pop.	±% p.a.
1968	147	—
1975	142	−0.49%
1982	144	+0.20%
1990	108	−3.53%
1999	117	+0.89%
2007	121	+0.42%
2012	152	+4.67%
2017	124	−3.99%
2023	138	+1.80%
Source: INSEE

== See also ==
- Communes of the Ain department
