= Canton of Belley =

Coordinates: 45°45′33″N 5°41′21″E

Belley
- Canton
- Interactive map of Belley
- Country: France
- Region: Auvergne-Rhône-Alpes
- Department: Ain
- No. of communes: {{{nbcomm}}}
- Area: 333.97 km^{2} (128.95 sq mi)
- Population (2023): 25,557
  - Density: 76.525/km^{2} (198.20/sq mi)
- INSEE code: 01 04

The canton of Belley is one of the cantons of France and is located in the department of Ain and in the region of Auvergne-Rhône-Alpes.

== Geography ==
This canton is organized around Belley in the Arrondissement of Belley. Its altitude is between 203 meters in (Brégnier-Cordon) and 1,020 meters in (Conzieu) with an average of 286 m.

== Composition ==
At the French canton reorganisation which came into effect in March 2015, the canton was expanded from 24 to 37 communes (6 of which merged into the new communes Arboys-en-Bugey, Parves-et-Nattages and Chazey-Bons):

1. Ambléon
2. Andert-et-Condon
3. Arboys-en-Bugey
4. Belley
5. Brégnier-Cordon
6. Brens
7. La Burbanche
8. Ceyzérieu
9. Chazey-Bons
10. Cheignieu-la-Balme
11. Colomieu
12. Contrevoz
13. Conzieu
14. Cressin-Rochefort
15. Cuzieu
16. Flaxieu
17. Groslée-Saint-Benoît
18. Izieu
19. Lavours
20. Magnieu
21. Marignieu
22. Massignieu-de-Rives
23. Murs-et-Gélignieux
24. Parves-et-Nattages
25. Peyrieu
26. Pollieu
27. Prémeyzel
28. Rossillon
29. Saint-Germain-les-Paroisses
30. Saint-Martin-de-Bavel
31. Virieu-le-Grand
32. Virignin
33. Vongnes

== Demographics ==
Historical population
Year	Pop.	±% p.a.
2013	24,055	—
2018	24,679	+0.51%
Source: INSEE

== See also ==
- Cantons of the Ain department
- Arrondissement of Belley
