= Virignin =

Commune in Auvergne-Rhône-Alpes, France

- Commune
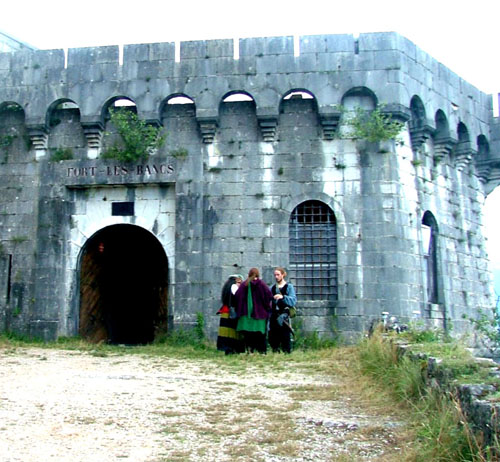
- Les Bancs fort
- Location of Virignin
- Location within France Location within Auvergne-Rhône-Alpes
- Coordinates: 45°42′58″N 5°42′43″E
- Country: France
- Region: Auvergne-Rhône-Alpes
- Department: Ain
- Arrondissement: Belley
- Canton: Belley
- Intercommunality: Bugey Sud

Government
  - Mayor (2026–32): Stéphanie Bavuz
- Area^{1}: 7.88 km^{2} (3.04 sq mi)
- Elevation: 225 m (738 ft)
- Highest elevation: 605 m (1,985 ft)
- Lowest elevation: 220 m (720 ft)
- Population (2023): 1,144
  - Density: 145/km^{2} (376/sq mi)
- Time zone: UTC+01:00 (CET)
  - Summer (DST): UTC+02:00 (CEST)
- INSEE/Postal code: 01454 /01300
- ^{1} French Land Register data, which excludes lakes, ponds, glaciers > 1 km^{2} (0.386 sq mi or 247 acres) and river estuaries.

Virignin (French pronunciation: [viʁiɲɛ̃]) is a commune in the Ain department in eastern France.

== Population ==
Historical population
Year	Pop.	±% p.a.
1968	394	—
1975	417	+0.81%
1982	517	+3.12%
1990	550	+0.78%
1999	643	+1.75%
2007	762	+2.15%
2012	939	+4.27%
2017	1,097	+3.16%
2023	1,144	+0.70%
Source: INSEE

== See also ==
- Communes of the Ain department
- List of medieval bridges in France
