= Conzieu =

Commune in Auvergne-Rhône-Alpes, France

- Commune
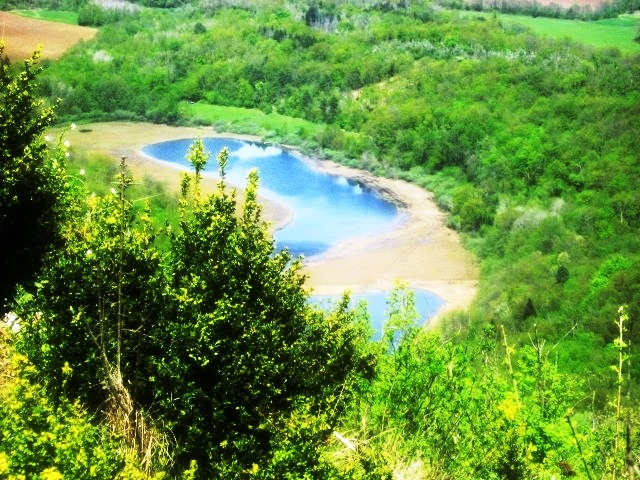
- Lakes of Conzieu
- Location of Conzieu
- Location within France Location within Auvergne-Rhône-Alpes
- Coordinates: 45°43′59″N 5°36′00″E
- Country: France
- Region: Auvergne-Rhône-Alpes
- Department: Ain
- Arrondissement: Belley
- Canton: Belley

Government
  - Mayor (2026–32): Pascal Pezant
- Area^{1}: 7.20 km^{2} (2.78 sq mi)
- Elevation: 380 m (1,250 ft)
- Highest elevation: 1,120 m (3,670 ft)
- Lowest elevation: 311 m (1,020 ft)
- Population (2023): 155
  - Density: 21.5/km^{2} (55.8/sq mi)
- Time zone: UTC+01:00 (CET)
  - Summer (DST): UTC+02:00 (CEST)
- INSEE/Postal code: 01117 /01300
- ^{1} French Land Register data, which excludes lakes, ponds, glaciers > 1 km^{2} (0.386 sq mi or 247 acres) and river estuaries.

Conzieu (French pronunciation: [kɔ̃zjø]) is a commune in the Ain department in eastern France.

== Population ==
Historical population
| Year | Pop. | ±% p.a. |
|---|---|---|
| 1968 | 99 | — |
| 1975 | 76 | −3.71% |
| 1982 | 75 | −0.19% |
| 1990 | 79 | +0.65% |
| 1999 | 100 | +2.65% |
| 2007 | 111 | +1.31% |
| 2012 | 145 | +5.49% |
| 2017 | 148 | +0.41% |
| 2023 | 155 | +0.77% |
Source: INSEE

== See also ==
- Communes of the Ain department
- Lacs de Conzieu
