= Lac de Virieu =

Lake in France

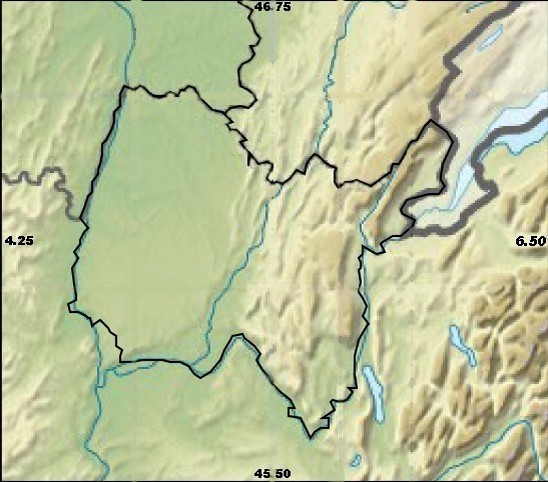
- Location within Ain
- Location: Ain
- Coordinates: 45°49′44″N 5°38′35″E
- Basin countries: France
- Surface area: 4 ha (9.9 acres)
- Max. depth: 15 m (49 ft)

Lac de Virieu is a lake at Virieu-le-Grand in the Ain department of France. The lake has a surface area of 4 ha and a maximum depth of 15 m.
