= Brens, Ain =

Commune in Auvergne-Rhône-Alpes, France

Brens
- Commune
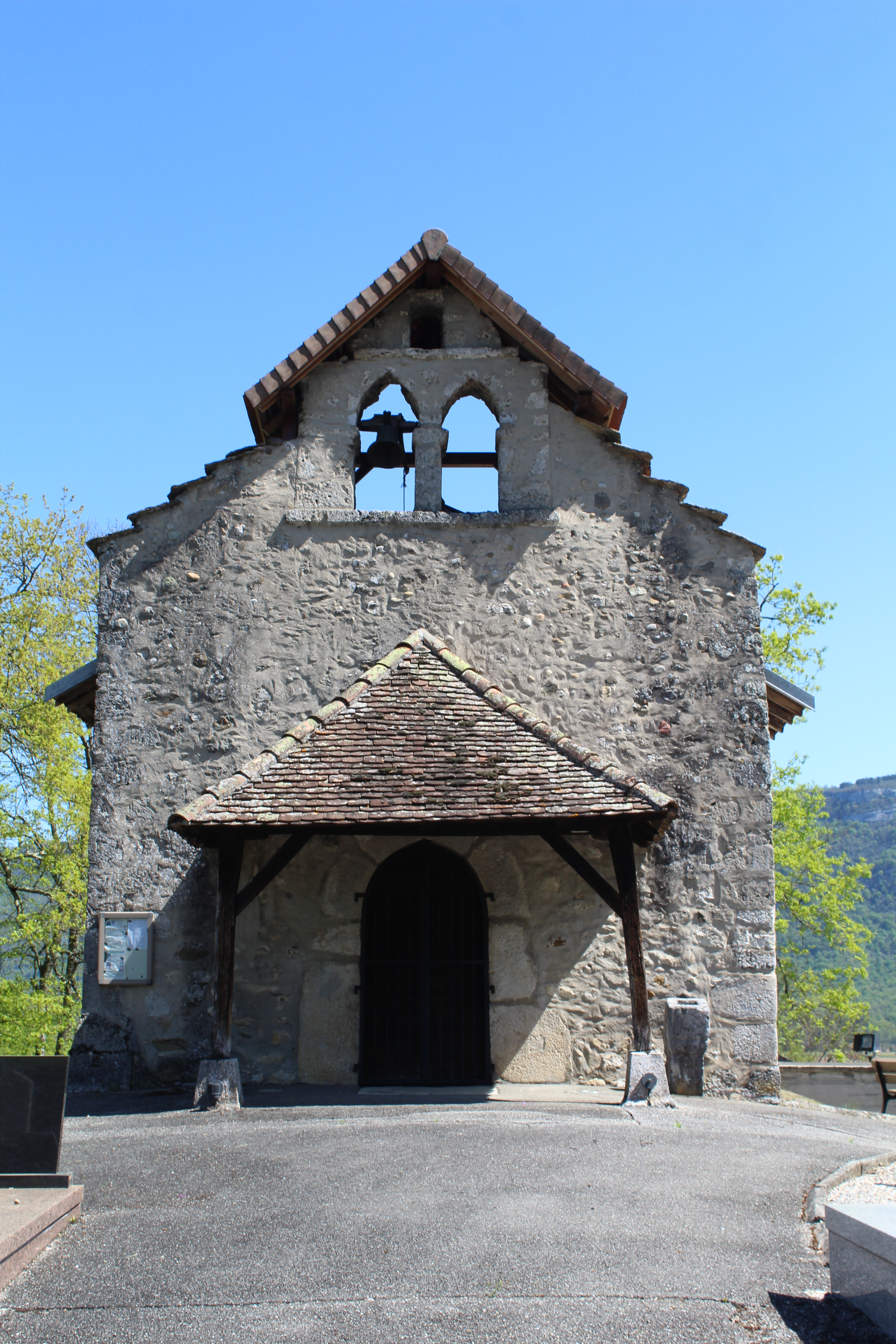
- Church of St. Michel
- Location of Brens
- Location within France Location within Auvergne-Rhône-Alpes
- Coordinates: 45°43′07″N 5°41′45″E
- Country: France
- Region: Auvergne-Rhône-Alpes
- Department: Ain
- Arrondissement: Belley
- Canton: Belley
- Intercommunality: Bugey Sud

Government
  - Mayor (2026–32): Sandrine Lachize Piccino
- Area^{1}: 6.90 km^{2} (2.66 sq mi)
- Elevation: 250 m (820 ft)
- Highest elevation: 403 m (1,322 ft)
- Lowest elevation: 217 m (712 ft)
- Population (2023): 1,123
  - Density: 163/km^{2} (422/sq mi)
- Time zone: UTC+01:00 (CET)
  - Summer (DST): UTC+02:00 (CEST)
- INSEE/Postal code: 01061 /01300
- Website: https://www.brens01300.fr/
- ^{1} French Land Register data, which excludes lakes, ponds, glaciers > 1 km^{2} (0.386 sq mi or 247 acres) and river estuaries.

Brens (French pronunciation: [bʁɛ̃s]) is a commune in the Ain department in eastern France.

== Population ==
Historical population
Year	Pop.	±% p.a.
1968	342	—
1975	395	+2.08%
1982	475	+2.67%
1990	638	+3.76%
1999	731	+1.52%
2007	920	+2.92%
2012	1,215	+5.72%
2017	1,166	−0.82%
2023	1,123	−0.62%
Source: INSEE

== See also ==
- Communes of the Ain department
