= Saint-Germain-les-Paroisses =

Commune in Auvergne-Rhône-Alpes, France

- Commune
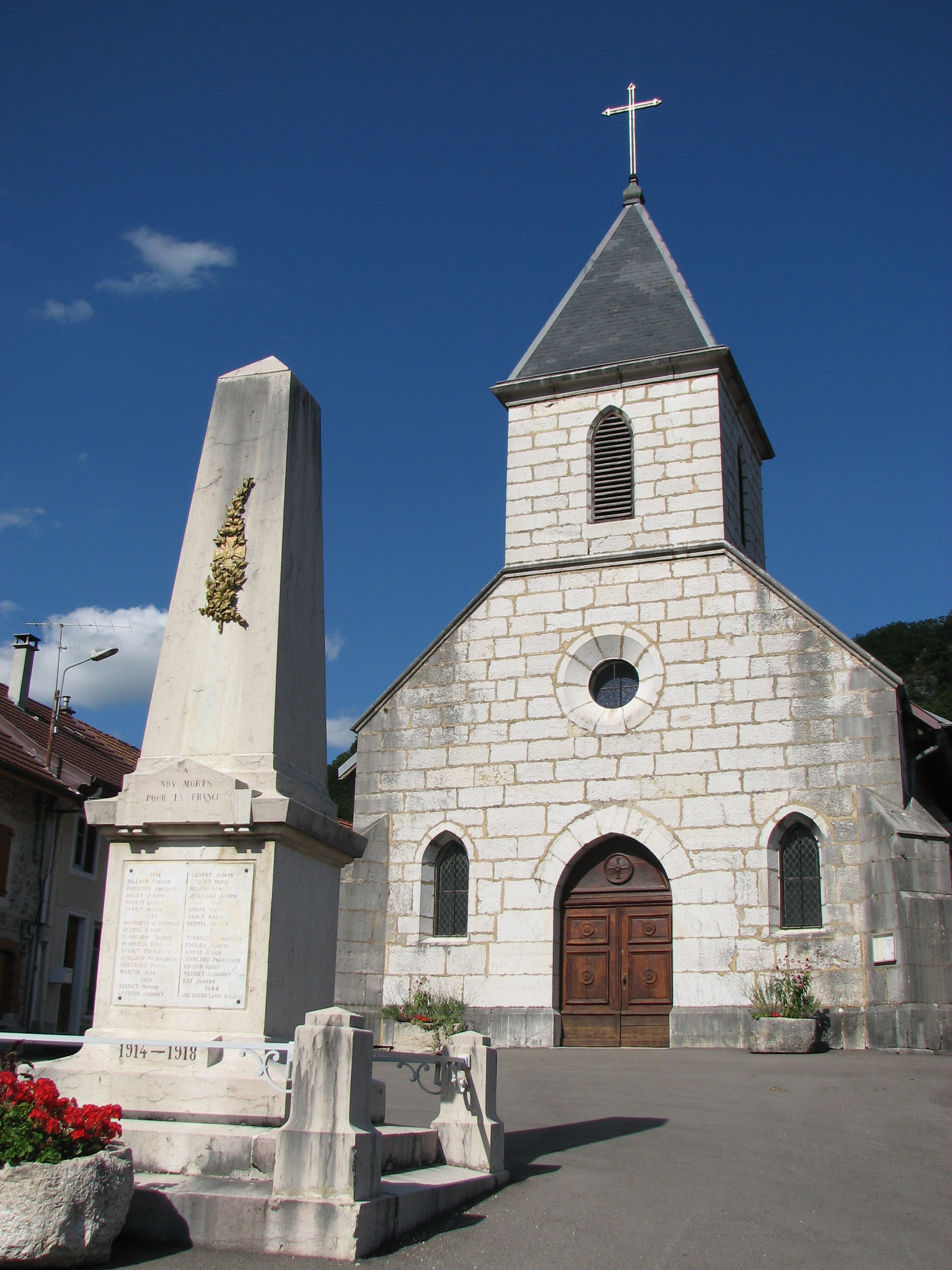
- Location of Saint-Germain-les-Paroisses
- Location within France Location within Auvergne-Rhône-Alpes
- Coordinates: 45°46′00″N 5°37′00″E
- Country: France
- Region: Auvergne-Rhône-Alpes
- Department: Ain
- Arrondissement: Belley
- Canton: Belley

Government
  - Mayor (2026–32): Régis Castin
- Area^{1}: 16.27 km^{2} (6.28 sq mi)
- Elevation: 385 m (1,263 ft)
- Highest elevation: 1,000 m (3,300 ft)
- Lowest elevation: 295 m (968 ft)
- Population (2023): 422
  - Density: 25.9/km^{2} (67.2/sq mi)
- Time zone: UTC+01:00 (CET)
  - Summer (DST): UTC+02:00 (CEST)
- INSEE/Postal code: 01358 /01300
- ^{1} French Land Register data, which excludes lakes, ponds, glaciers > 1 km^{2} (0.386 sq mi or 247 acres) and river estuaries.

Saint-Germain-les-Paroisses (French pronunciation: [sɛ̃ ʒɛʁmɛ̃ le paʁwas]) is a commune in the Ain department in eastern France.

== Population ==
Historical population
| Year | Pop. | ±% p.a. |
|---|---|---|
| 1968 | 294 | — |
| 1975 | 264 | −1.53% |
| 1982 | 258 | −0.33% |
| 1990 | 273 | +0.71% |
| 1999 | 307 | +1.31% |
| 2007 | 360 | +2.01% |
| 2012 | 408 | +2.53% |
| 2017 | 434 | +1.24% |
| 2023 | 422 | −0.47% |
Source: INSEE

== Language ==
The most commonly spoken language is French

== See also ==
- Communes of the Ain department
