= Lacs de Conzieu =

Lake in France

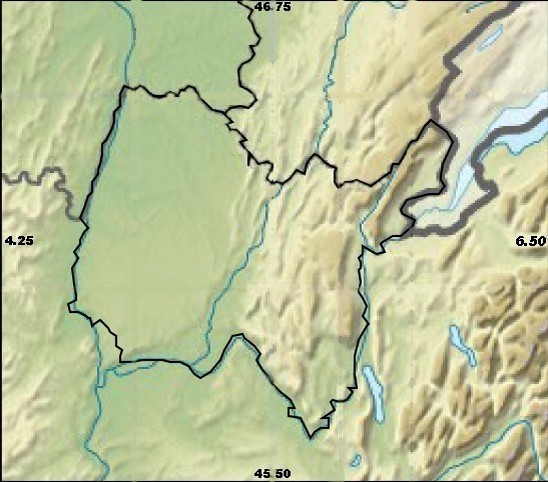
- Location within Ain
- Location: Ain
- Coordinates: 45°42′44″N 5°36′34″E
- Basin countries: France

Lacs de Conzieu are a group of three small lakes at Conzieu in the Ain department of France.
