= Lac de Chavoley =

Lake in the Ain department, France

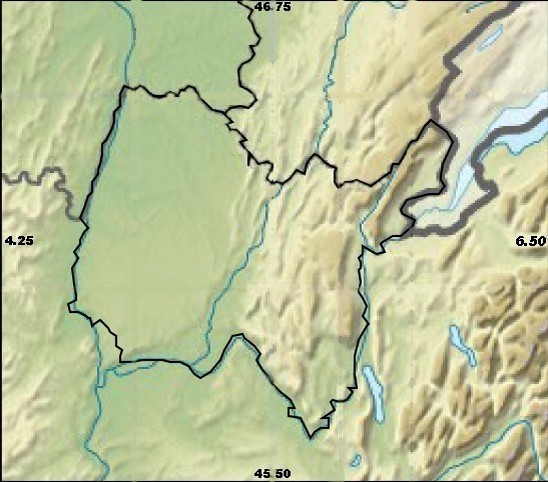
- Location within Ain
- Location: Ain
- Coordinates: 45°49′28″N 5°41′47″E
- Basin countries: France

Lac de Chavoley is a lake at Ceyzérieu in the Ain department, France. It is located 300 m east of Lac de Morgnieu.
