= Pollieu =

Commune in Auvergne-Rhône-Alpes, France

- Commune
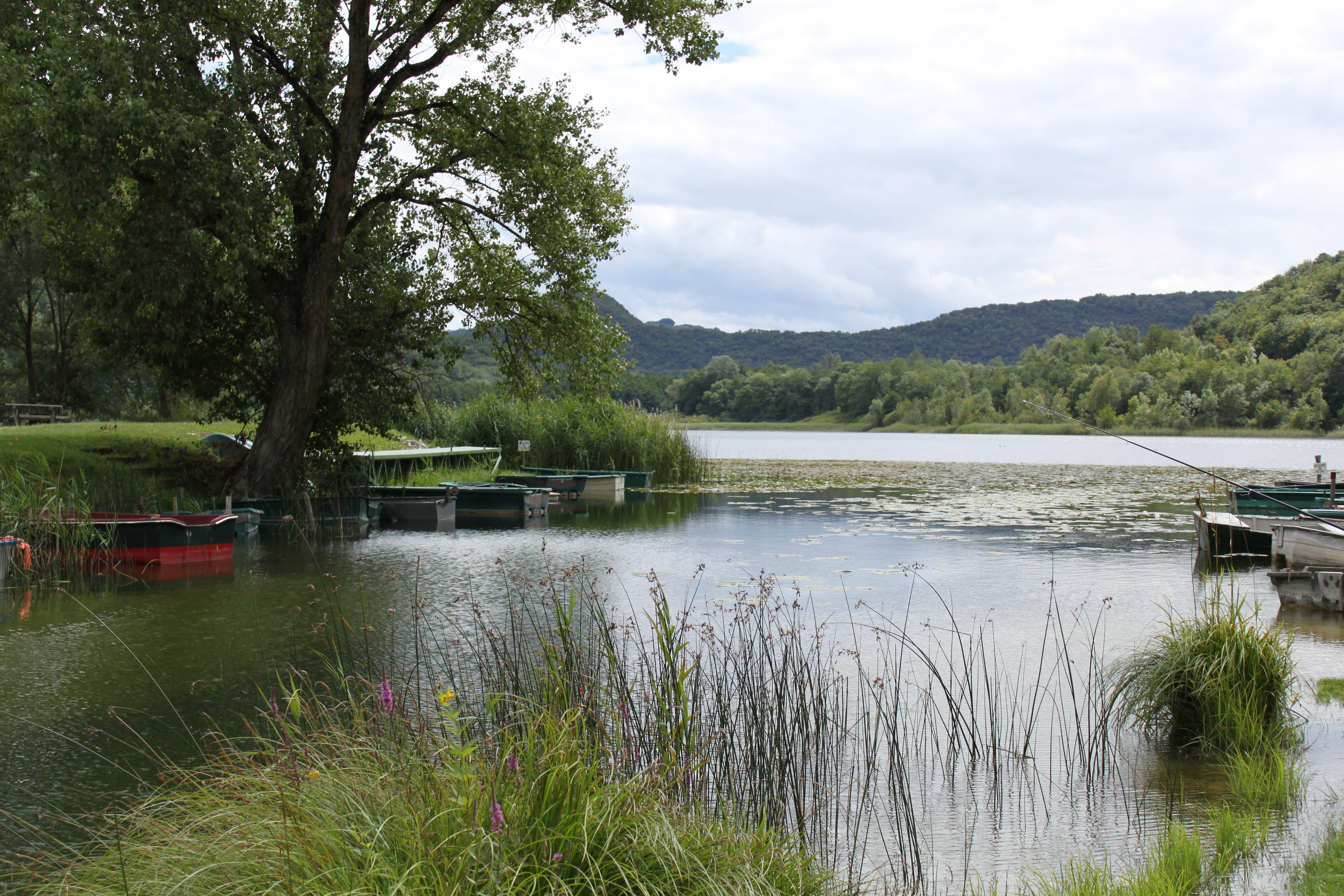
- Barterand Lake
- Location of Pollieu
- Location within France Location within Auvergne-Rhône-Alpes
- Coordinates: 45°48′N 5°45′E
- Country: France
- Region: Auvergne-Rhône-Alpes
- Department: Ain
- Arrondissement: Belley
- Canton: Belley

Government
  - Mayor (2026–32): Erwan Jacquier
- Area^{1}: 3.71 km^{2} (1.43 sq mi)
- Elevation: 260 m (850 ft)
- Highest elevation: 480 m (1,570 ft)
- Lowest elevation: 225 m (738 ft)
- Population (2023): 167
  - Density: 45.0/km^{2} (117/sq mi)
- Time zone: UTC+01:00 (CET)
  - Summer (DST): UTC+02:00 (CEST)
- INSEE/Postal code: 01302 /01300
- ^{1} French Land Register data, which excludes lakes, ponds, glaciers > 1 km^{2} (0.386 sq mi or 247 acres) and river estuaries.

Pollieu (French pronunciation: [pɔljø]) is a commune in the Ain department in eastern France.

== Population ==
Historical population
| Year | Pop. | ±% p.a. |
|---|---|---|
| 1968 | 100 | — |
| 1975 | 91 | −1.34% |
| 1982 | 101 | +1.50% |
| 1990 | 108 | +0.84% |
| 1999 | 122 | +1.36% |
| 2007 | 155 | +3.04% |
| 2012 | 157 | +0.26% |
| 2017 | 159 | +0.25% |
| 2023 | 167 | +0.82% |
Source: INSEE

== See also ==
- Communes of the Ain department
- Lac de Barterand
