= Saint-Martin-de-Bavel =

Commune in Auvergne-Rhône-Alpes, France

- Commune
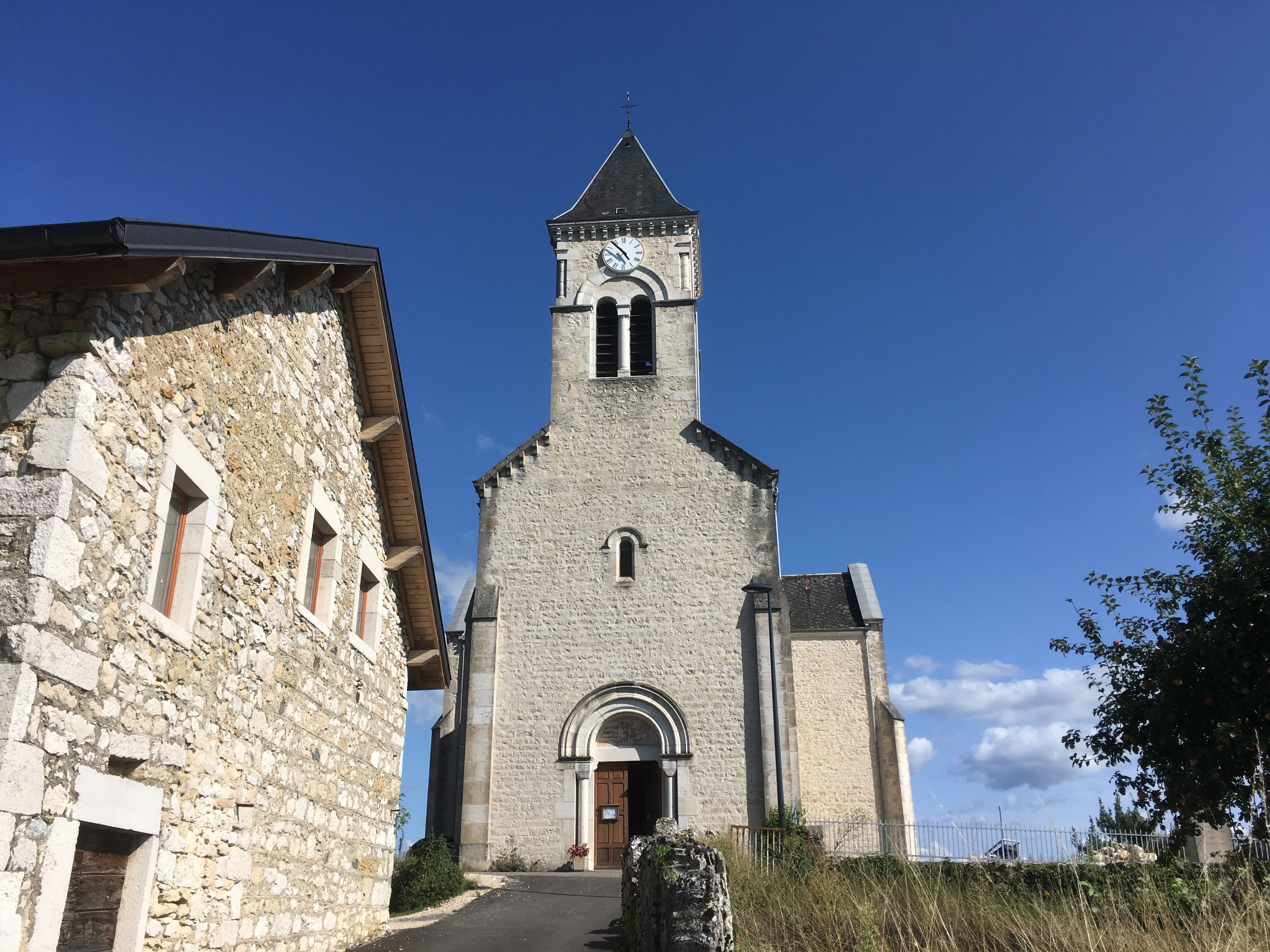
- Location of Saint-Martin-de-Bavel
- Location within France Location within Auvergne-Rhône-Alpes
- Coordinates: 45°51′00″N 5°41′00″E
- Country: France
- Region: Auvergne-Rhône-Alpes
- Department: Ain
- Arrondissement: Belley
- Canton: Belley
- Intercommunality: CC Bugey Sud

Government
  - Mayor (2026–32): Xavier Vincent
- Area^{1}: 8.50 km^{2} (3.28 sq mi)
- Elevation: 339 m (1,112 ft)
- Highest elevation: 442 m (1,450 ft)
- Lowest elevation: 249 m (817 ft)
- Population (2023): 428
  - Density: 50.4/km^{2} (130/sq mi)
- Demonym: Saint-Martenants
- Time zone: UTC+01:00 (CET)
  - Summer (DST): UTC+02:00 (CEST)
- INSEE/Postal code: 01372 /01510
- ^{1} French Land Register data, which excludes lakes, ponds, glaciers > 1 km^{2} (0.386 sq mi or 247 acres) and river estuaries.

Saint-Martin-de-Bavel (French pronunciation: [sɛ̃ maʁtɛ̃ də bavɛl]) is a commune in the Ain department in eastern France.

== Demographics ==
Its inhabitants are called Saint-Martenant(e)s in French.

Historical population

| Year | Pop. | ±% p.a. |
|---|---|---|
| 1793 | 447 | — |
| 1800 | 460 | +0.41% |
| 1806 | 533 | +2.49% |
| 1821 | 486 | −0.61% |
| 1831 | 598 | +2.10% |
| 1836 | 621 | +0.76% |
| 1841 | 670 | +1.53% |
| 1846 | 668 | −0.06% |
| 1851 | 693 | +0.74% |
| 1856 | 640 | −1.58% |
| 1861 | 619 | −0.67% |
| 1866 | 618 | −0.03% |
| 1872 | 658 | +1.05% |
| 1876 | 668 | +0.38% |
| 1881 | 661 | −0.21% |
| 1886 | 665 | +0.12% |
| 1891 | 659 | −0.18% |
| 1896 | 617 | −1.31% |
| 1901 | 562 | −1.85% |

| Year | Pop. | ±% p.a. |
|---|---|---|
| 1906 | 557 | −0.18% |
| 1911 | 565 | +0.29% |
| 1921 | 512 | −0.98% |
| 1926 | 481 | −1.24% |
| 1931 | 445 | −1.54% |
| 1936 | 407 | −1.77% |
| 1946 | 371 | −0.92% |
| 1954 | 331 | −1.42% |
| 1962 | 305 | −1.02% |
| 1968 | 304 | −0.05% |
| 1975 | 304 | +0.00% |
| 1982 | 282 | −1.07% |
| 1990 | 327 | +1.87% |
| 1999 | 332 | +0.17% |
| 2007 | 453 | +3.96% |
| 2012 | 426 | −1.22% |
| 2017 | 438 | +0.56% |
| 2023 | 428 | −0.38% |

Source: EHESS and INSEE (1968-2017)

== Land distribution ==
=== Typology ===
Saint-Martin-de-Bavel is a rural commune. It is a commune of relatively low density as classified by the national commune density classification of the INSEE.

The commune is part of the Belley region as defined by the INSEE. This region, which encompasses 31 communes, contains less than 50,000 inhabitants in total.

=== Geography ===
According to the European land distribution database Corine Land Cover (CLC), there is significant agricultural land use in the region (57.7% in 2018)—a lesser figure than in 1990 (62.8%). In 2018, the detailed land breakdown was the following: forests (36%), agricultural zones (23.7%), meadows (22.7%), arable land (11.3%), urban areas (4.8%), shrubs and/or herbaceous vegetation (1.6%).

== Personalities ==
- Joseph-Benoît (1812-1880), a canut from Lyon, was born in Saint-Martin-de-Bavel.
- Jean Augustin Carrié de Boissy (1764-1838), a French military man, died in Saint-Martin-de-Bavel.
- Louis-Anthelme Carrier (1773-1838), military general, was born and died in the commune.

== See also ==
- Communes of the Ain department
