= Groslée =

Commune in Ain, France

- Part of Groslée-Saint-Benoît
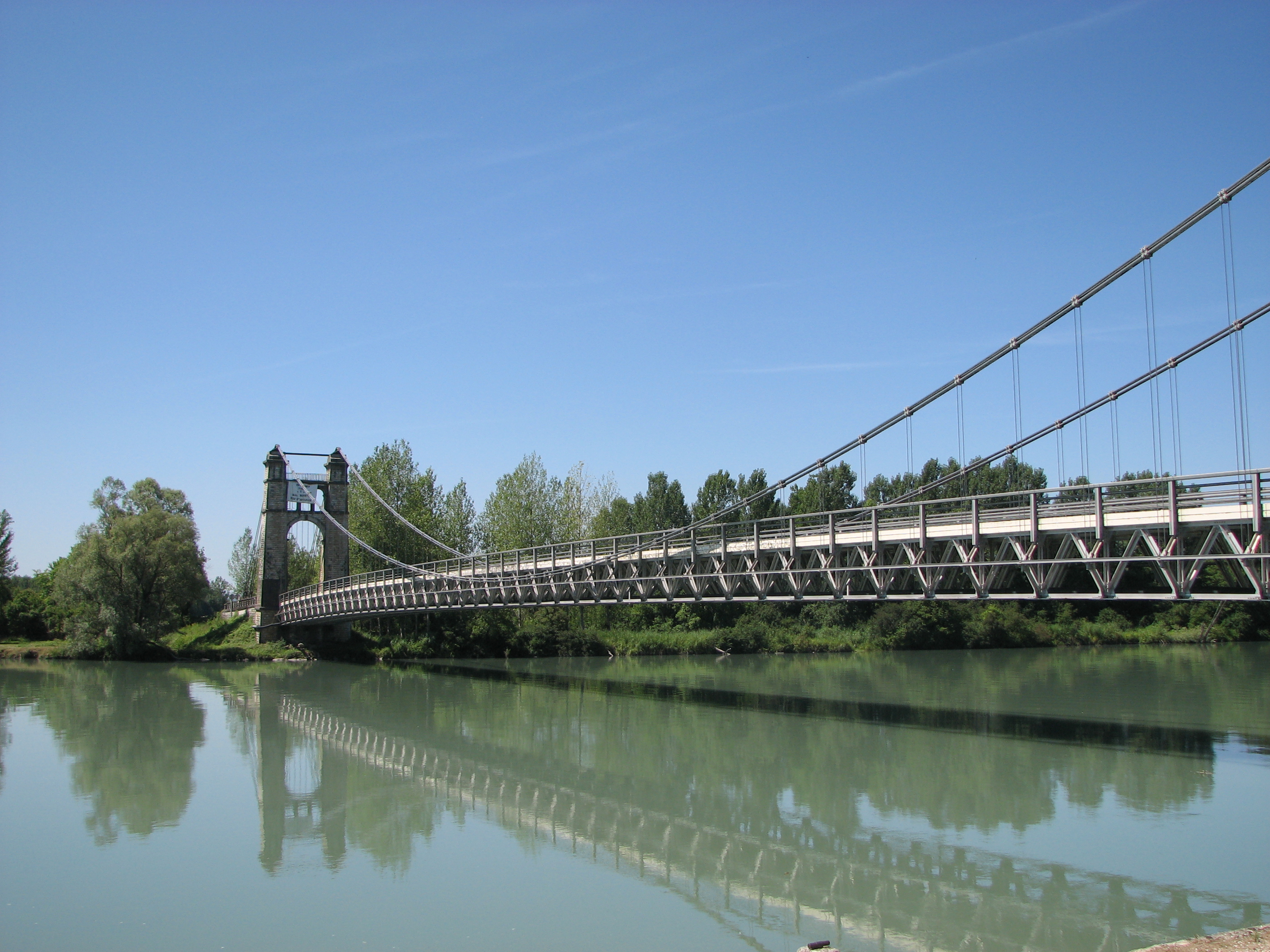
- Location of Groslée
- Location within France Location within Auvergne-Rhône-Alpes
- Coordinates: 45°43′00″N 5°34′00″E
- Country: France
- Region: Auvergne-Rhône-Alpes
- Department: Ain
- Arrondissement: Belley
- Canton: Lagnieu
- Commune: Groslée-Saint-Benoît
- Area^{1}: 7.27 km^{2} (2.81 sq mi)
- Elevation: 210 m (690 ft)
- Highest elevation: 1,000 m (3,300 ft)
- Lowest elevation: 202 m (663 ft)
- Population (2022): 320
  - Density: 44/km^{2} (110/sq mi)
- Time zone: UTC+01:00 (CET)
  - Summer (DST): UTC+02:00 (CEST)
- Postal code: 01680
- ^{1} French Land Register data, which excludes lakes, ponds, glaciers > 1 km^{2} (0.386 sq mi or 247 acres) and river estuaries.

Groslée (French pronunciation: [ɡʁole]) is a former commune in the Ain department in eastern France. On 1 January 2016, it was merged into the new commune Groslée-Saint-Benoît.

== Population ==
Historical population
Year	Pop.	±% p.a.
2006	352	—
2011	352	+0.00%
2022	320	−0.86%
Source: INSEE

== See also ==
- Communes of the Ain department
- Lac de Crotel
