= Cheignieu-la-Balme =

Commune in Auvergne-Rhône-Alpes, France

- Commune
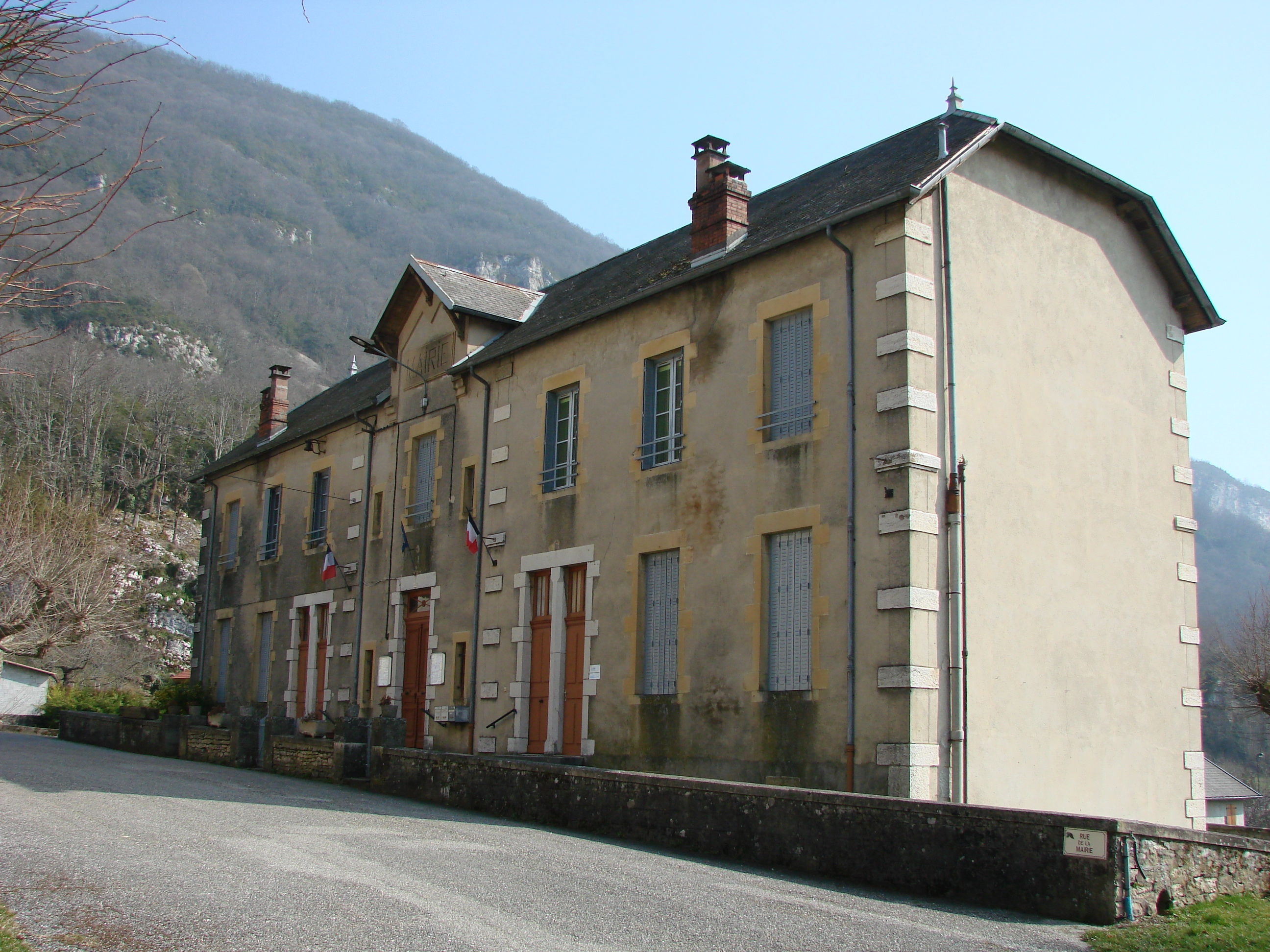
- Town hall

- Coat of arms
- Location of Cheignieu-la-Balme
- Location within France Location within Auvergne-Rhône-Alpes
- Coordinates: 45°49′41″N 5°36′30″E
- Country: France
- Region: Auvergne-Rhône-Alpes
- Department: Ain
- Arrondissement: Belley
- Canton: Belley
- Intercommunality: Bugey Sud

Government
  - Mayor (2026–32): Marc Buet
- Area^{1}: 6.26 km^{2} (2.42 sq mi)
- Elevation: 345 m (1,132 ft)
- Highest elevation: 1,166 m (3,825 ft)
- Lowest elevation: 269 m (883 ft)
- Population (2023): 131
  - Density: 20.9/km^{2} (54.2/sq mi)
- Time zone: UTC+01:00 (CET)
  - Summer (DST): UTC+02:00 (CEST)
- INSEE/Postal code: 01100 /01510
- ^{1} French Land Register data, which excludes lakes, ponds, glaciers > 1 km^{2} (0.386 sq mi or 247 acres) and river estuaries.

Cheignieu-la-Balme (French pronunciation: [ʃɛɲø la balm]) is a commune in the Ain department in eastern France.

== Population ==
Historical population
Year	Pop.	±% p.a.
1968	141	—
1975	141	+0.00%
1982	141	+0.00%
1990	110	−3.06%
1999	112	+0.20%
2007	144	+3.19%
2012	152	+1.09%
2017	134	−2.49%
2023	131	−0.38%
Source: INSEE

== See also ==
- Communes of the Ain department
