= Lac de Chailloux =

Lake in France

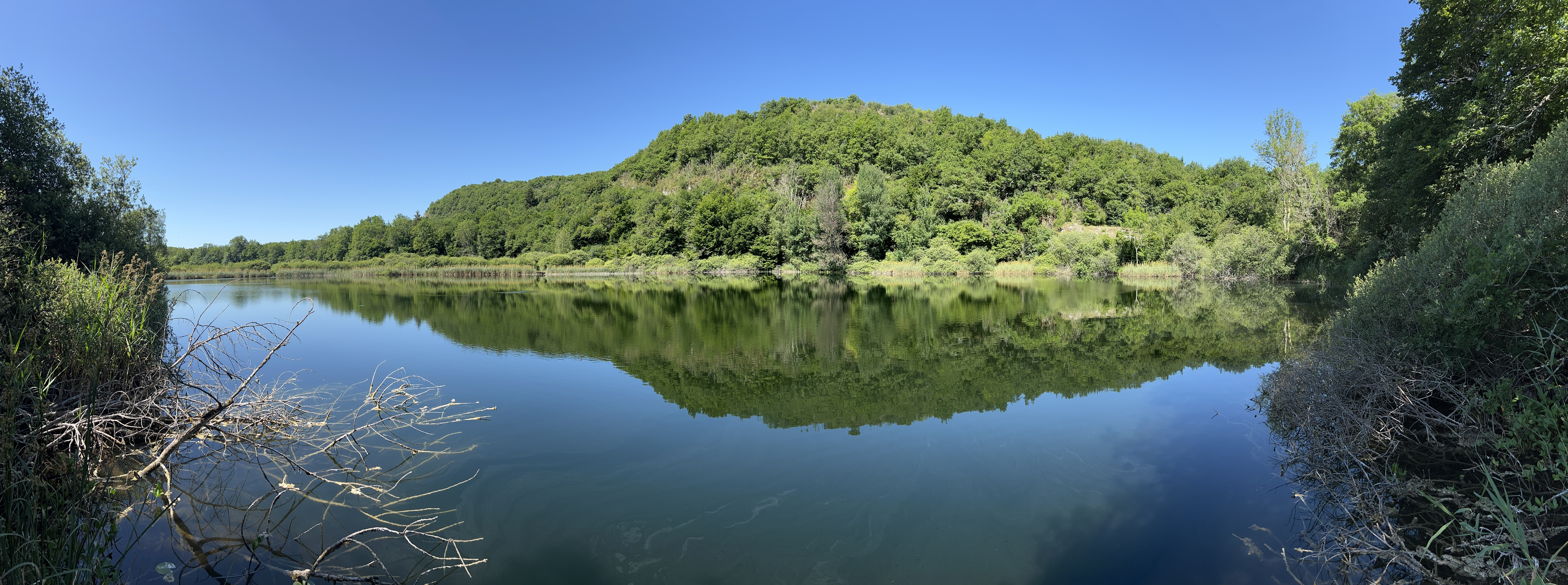

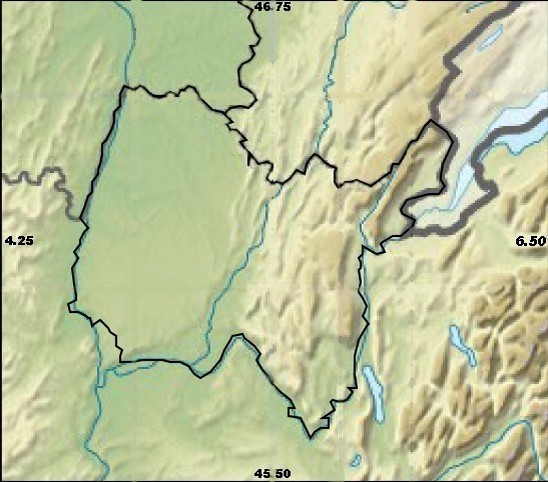
- Location within Ain
- Location: Ain
- Coordinates: 45°47′11″N 5°38′20″E
- Basin countries: France

Lac de Chailloux is a small lake at Contrevoz in the Ain department, France.
