= Lacs des Hôpitaux =

Pair of lakes in France

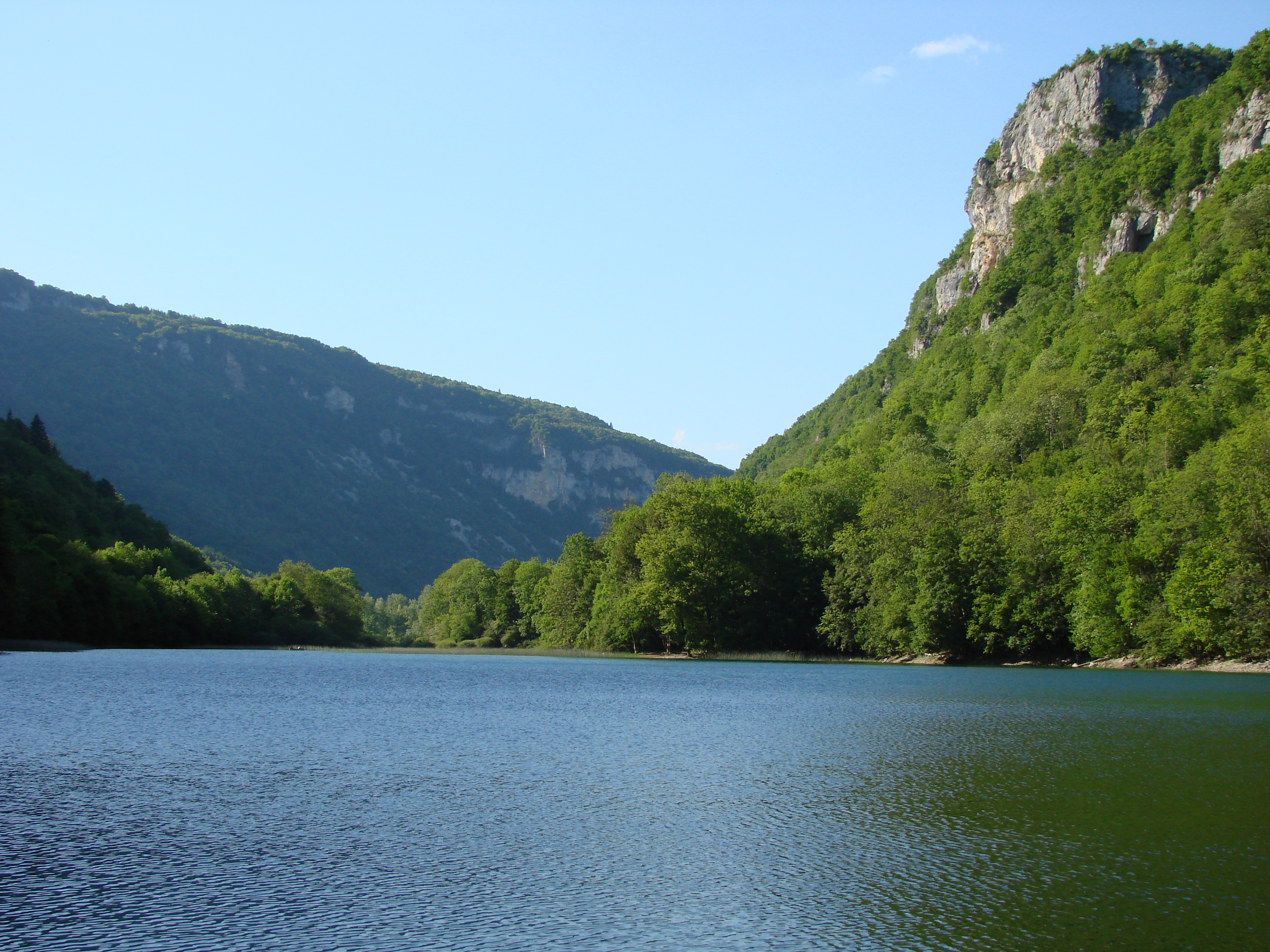

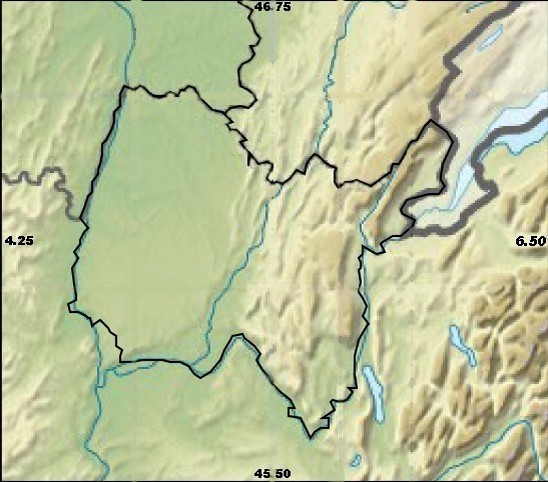
- Location within Ain
- Location: Ain, France
- Coordinates: 45°51′44″N 5°32′22″E; 45°52′35″N 5°31′58″E
- Surface area: 17 hectares (42 acres)

Lacs des Hôpitaux is a pair of lakes at La Burbanche in the Ain department of France. With an area of 17 hectares, it is widely used for recreational fishing and belongs to a fishing association, Aappma Albarine, run by volunteers. The eastern part of the lake, associated with the marsh and the source of Furan, is classified a natural area of ecological interest, fauna and flora.
