= Rossillon =

Commune in Auvergne-Rhône-Alpes, France

- Commune
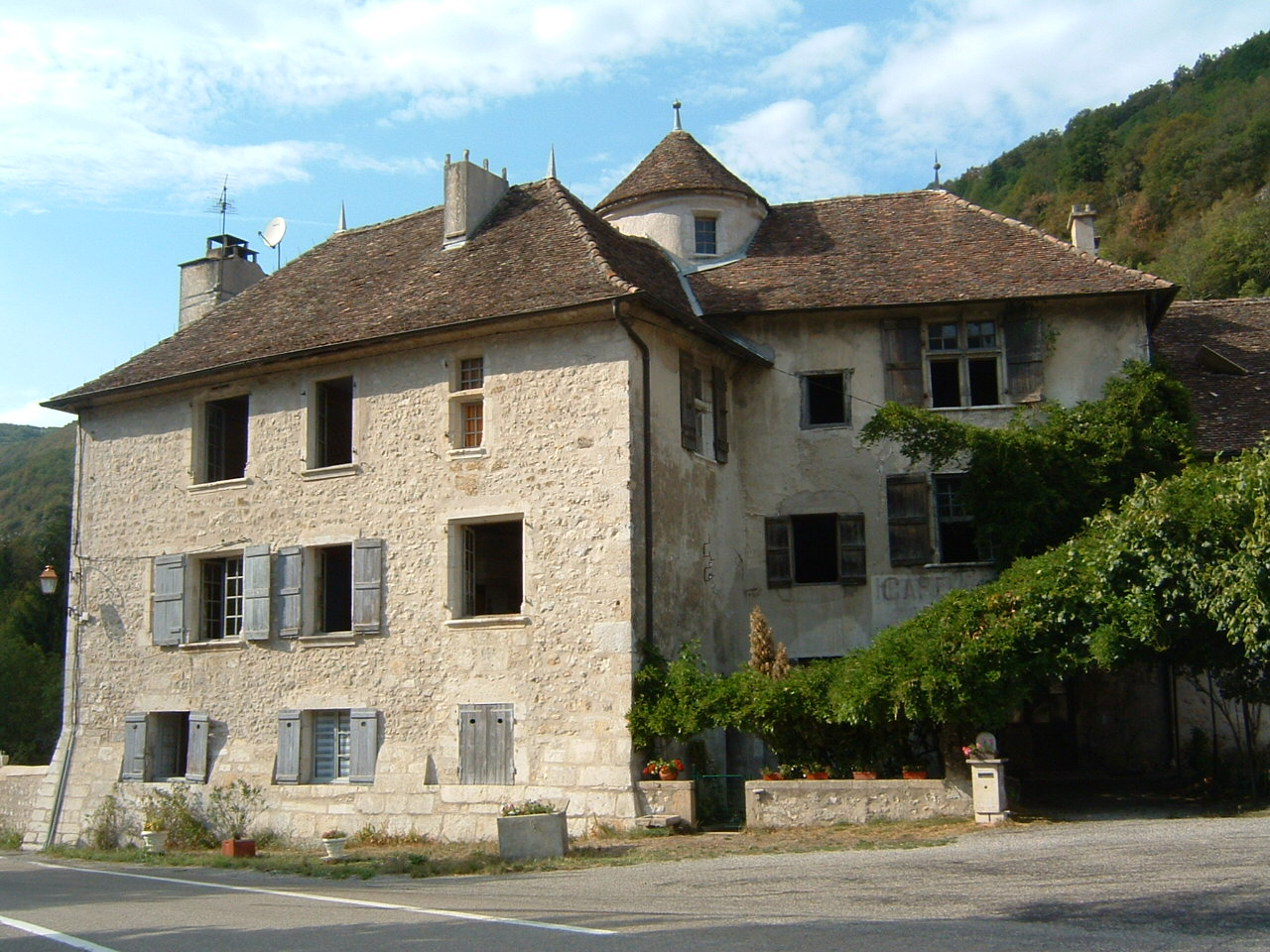
- Chateau
- Location of Rossillon
- Location within France Location within Auvergne-Rhône-Alpes
- Coordinates: 45°50′00″N 5°36′00″E
- Country: France
- Region: Auvergne-Rhône-Alpes
- Department: Ain
- Arrondissement: Belley
- Canton: Belley

Government
  - Mayor (2026–32): Jean-Yves Couilloud
- Area^{1}: 8.07 km^{2} (3.12 sq mi)
- Elevation: 330 m (1,080 ft)
- Highest elevation: 1,022 m (3,353 ft)
- Lowest elevation: 324 m (1,063 ft)
- Population (2023): 166
  - Density: 20.6/km^{2} (53.3/sq mi)
- Time zone: UTC+01:00 (CET)
  - Summer (DST): UTC+02:00 (CEST)
- INSEE/Postal code: 01329 /01510
- ^{1} French Land Register data, which excludes lakes, ponds, glaciers > 1 km^{2} (0.386 sq mi or 247 acres) and river estuaries.

Rossillon (French pronunciation: [ʁɔsijɔ̃]) is a commune in the Ain department in eastern France.

== Population ==
Historical population
Year	Pop.	±% p.a.
1968	130	—
1975	99	−3.82%
1982	96	−0.44%
1990	103	+0.88%
1999	147	+4.03%
2007	147	+0.00%
2012	145	−0.27%
2017	151	+0.81%
2023	166	+1.59%
Source: INSEE

== See also ==
- Communes of the Ain department
