= Vongnes =

Commune in Auvergne-Rhône-Alpes, France

- Commune
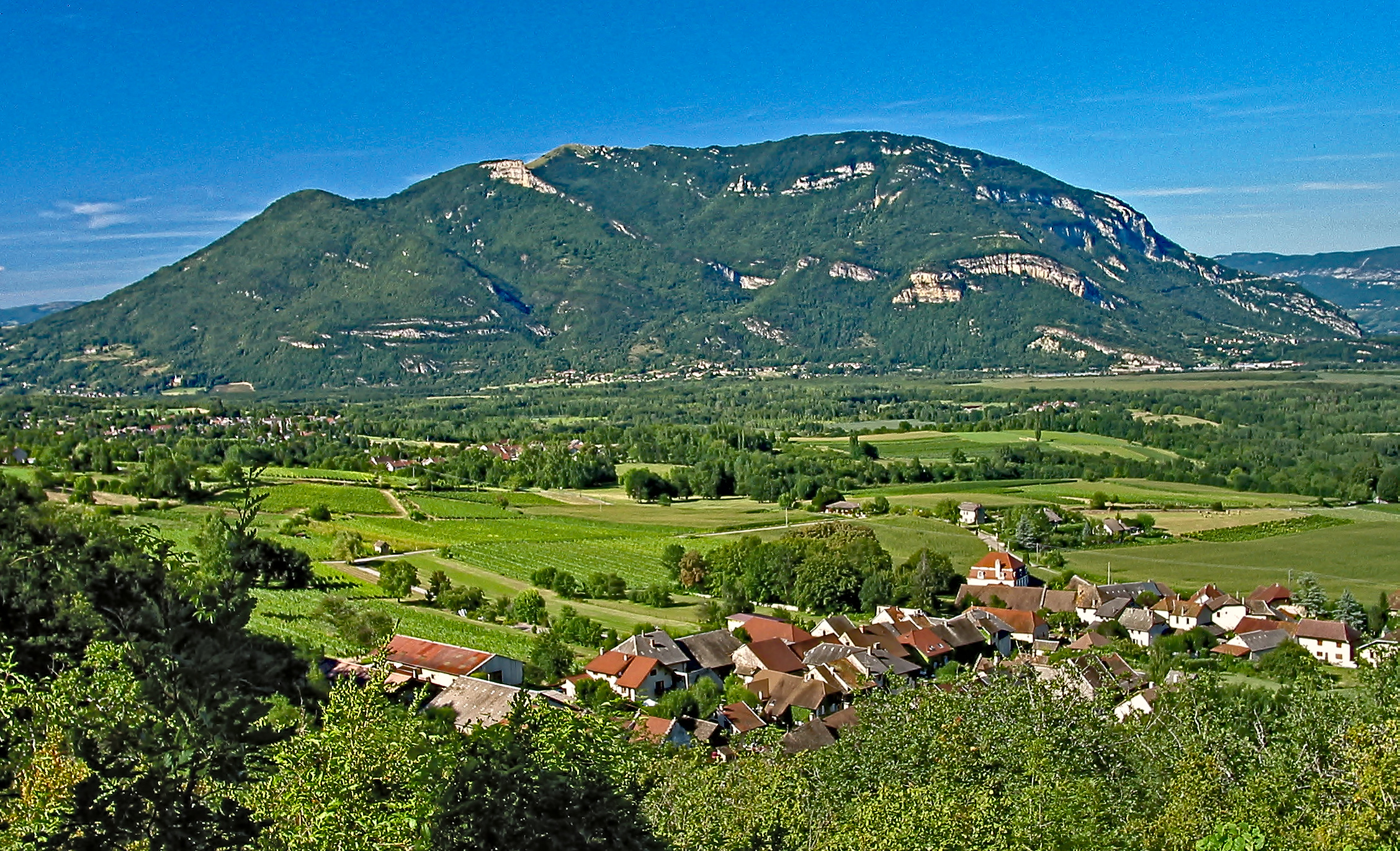
- Vongnes and the Grand Colombier
- Location of Vongnes
- Location within France Location within Auvergne-Rhône-Alpes
- Coordinates: 45°49′00″N 5°43′00″E
- Country: France
- Region: Auvergne-Rhône-Alpes
- Department: Ain
- Arrondissement: Belley
- Canton: Belley
- Intercommunality: Bugey Sud

Government
  - Mayor (2026–32): Joannes Guillon
- Area^{1}: 2.05 km^{2} (0.79 sq mi)
- Elevation: 320 m (1,050 ft)
- Highest elevation: 505 m (1,657 ft)
- Lowest elevation: 228 m (748 ft)
- Population (2023): 75
  - Density: 37/km^{2} (95/sq mi)
- Time zone: UTC+01:00 (CET)
  - Summer (DST): UTC+02:00 (CEST)
- INSEE/Postal code: 01456 /01350
- ^{1} French Land Register data, which excludes lakes, ponds, glaciers > 1 km^{2} (0.386 sq mi or 247 acres) and river estuaries.

Vongnes (French pronunciation: [vɔ̃ɲ]; Arpitan: Vongne) is a commune in the Ain department in eastern France.

== Population ==
Historical population
Year	Pop.	±% p.a.
1968	77	—
1975	74	−0.57%
1982	86	+2.17%
1990	92	+0.85%
1999	89	−0.37%
2007	66	−3.67%
2012	74	+2.31%
2017	70	−1.11%
2023	75	+1.16%
Source: INSEE

== See also ==
- Communes of the Ain department
