= Lac de Glandieu =

Lake in France

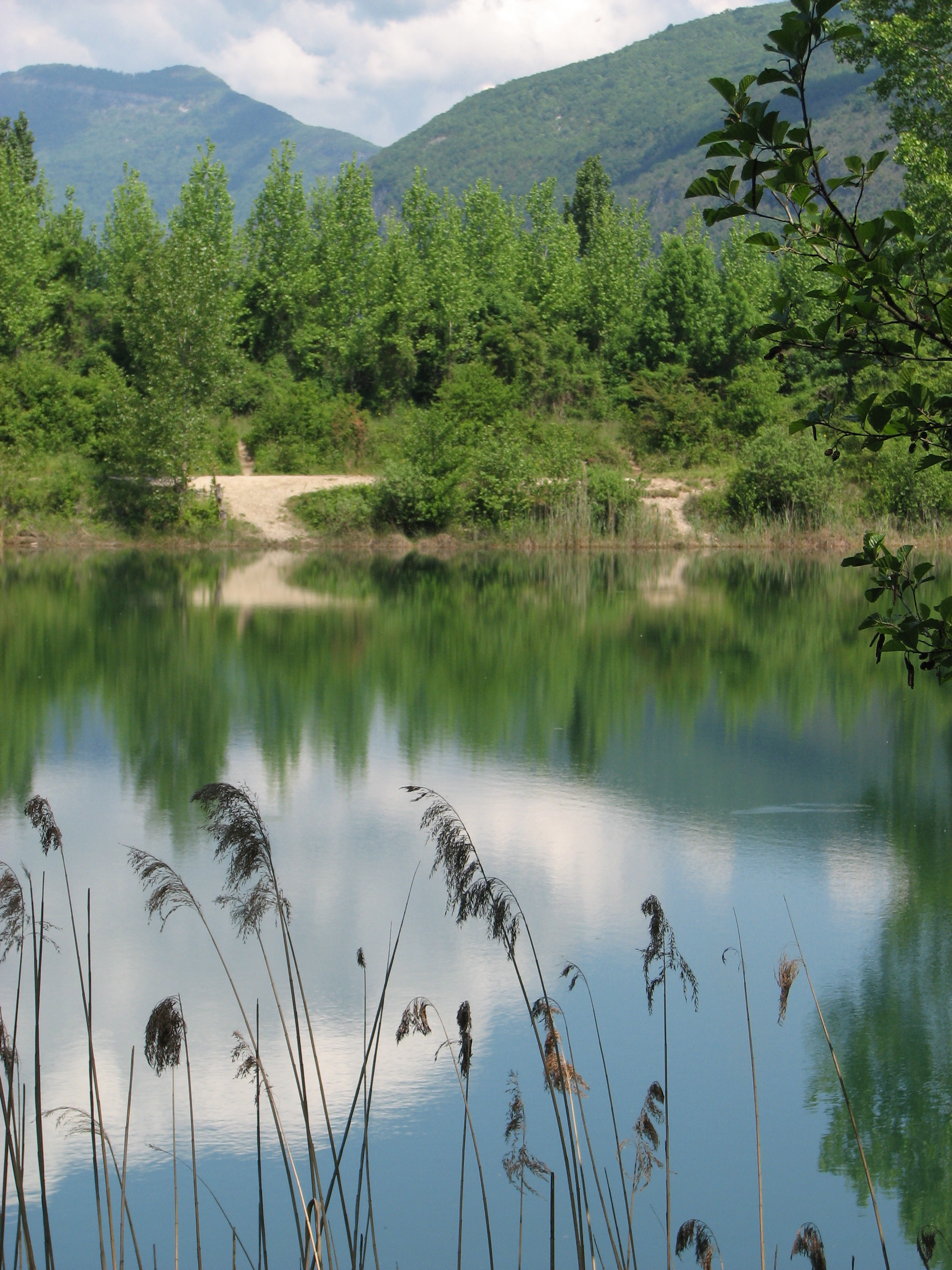

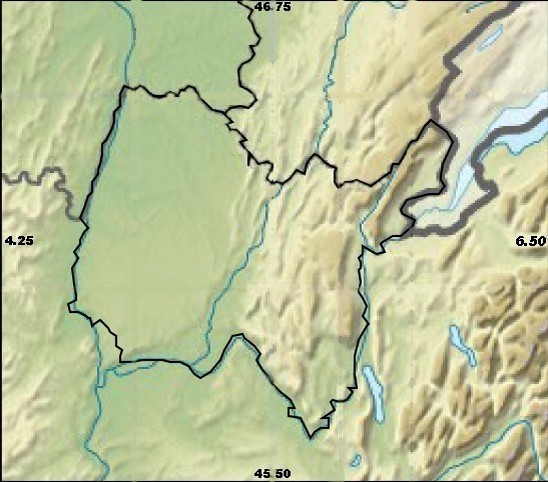
- Location within Ain
- Location: Ain
- Coordinates: 45.6558°N 5.6064°E
- Basin countries: France

Lac de Glandieu is a lake in Ain, France.
