= Lac de Barterand =

Lake in France

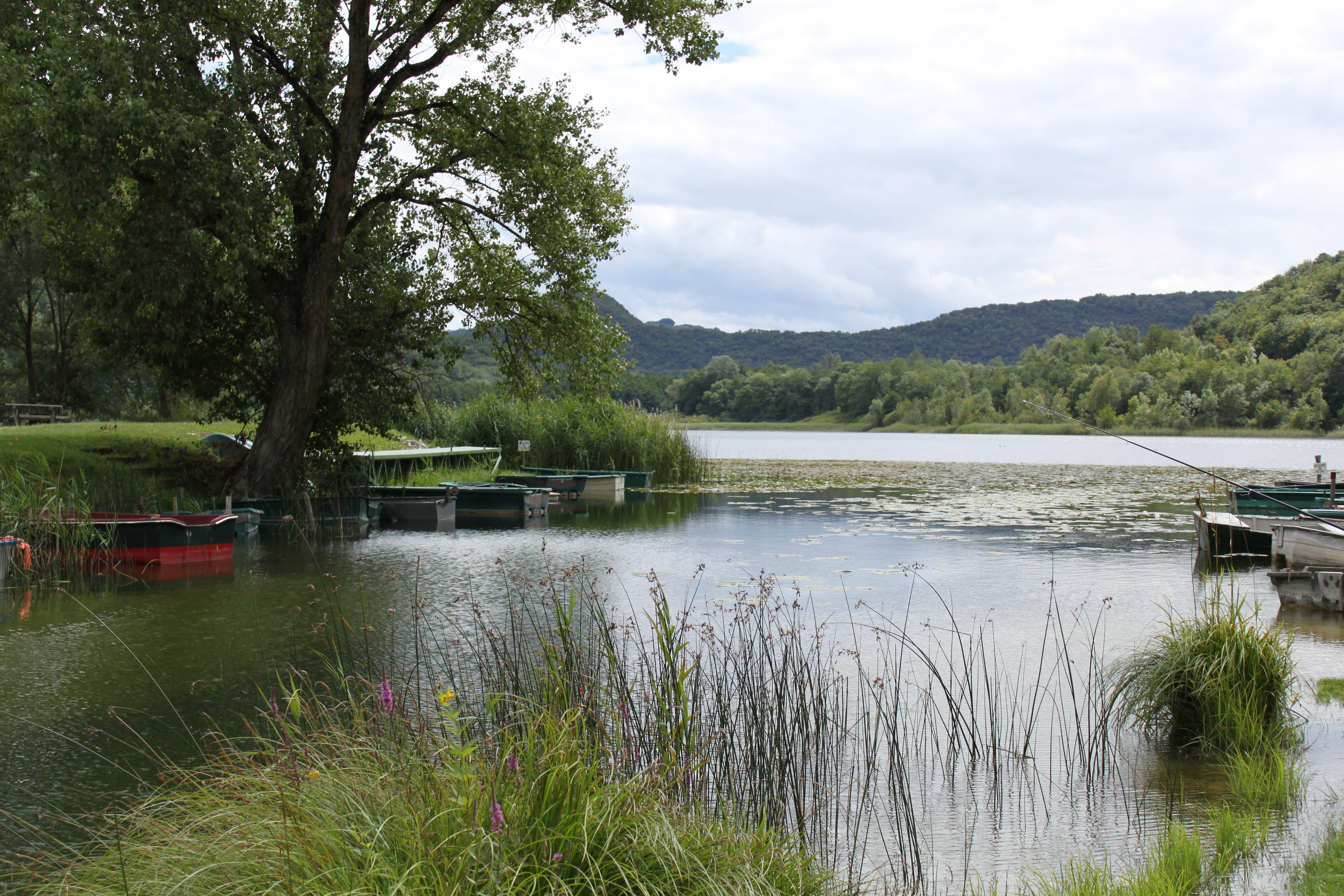

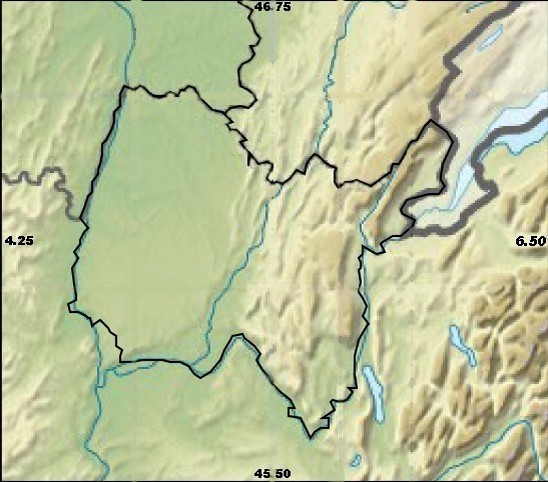
- Location within Ain
- Location: Ain
- Coordinates: 45°47′23″N 5°44′41″E
- Basin countries: France

Lac de Barterand is a lake in Pollieu, in the Ain department of France.
