= Lac de Morgnieu =

Lake in France

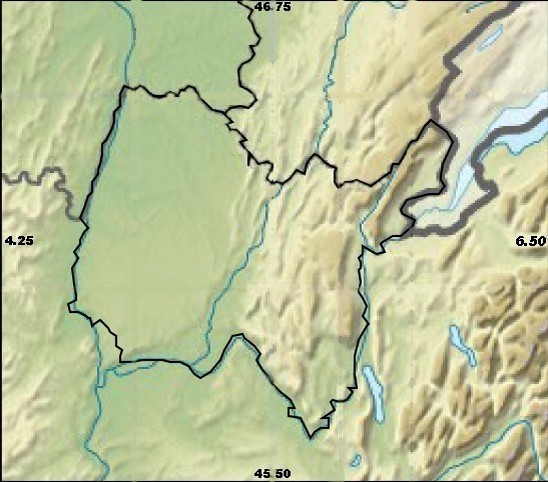
- Location within Ain
- Location: Ceyzérieu, Ain
- Coordinates: 45°49′25″N 5°41′13″E
- Basin countries: France

Lac de Morgnieu is a lake at Ceyzérieu in the Ain department of France. It is located 300 m West of Lac de Chavoley.
