= Marignieu =

Commune in Auvergne-Rhône-Alpes, France

- Commune
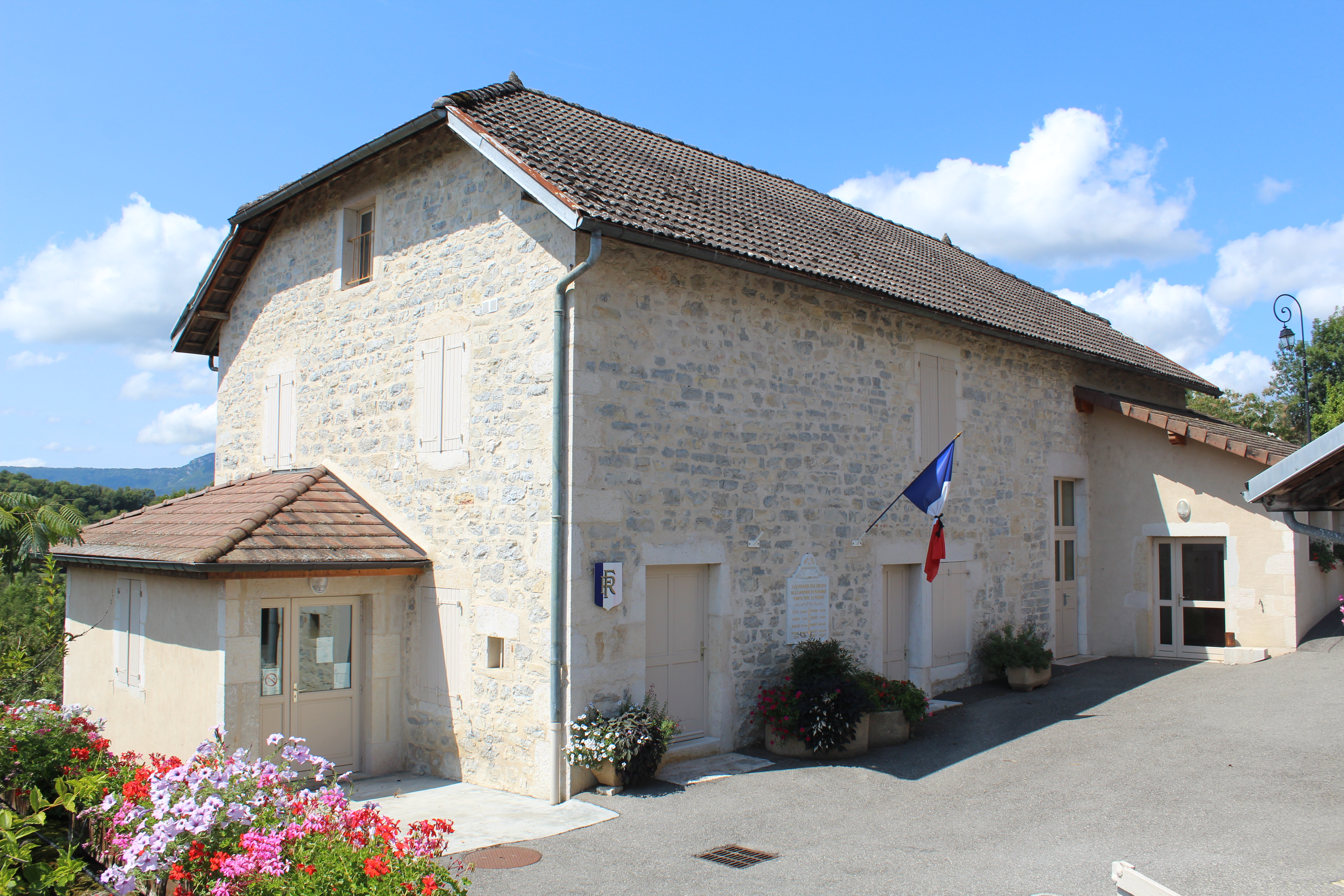
- Town hall
- Location of Marignieu
- Location within France Location within Auvergne-Rhône-Alpes
- Coordinates: 45°47′52″N 5°43′19″E
- Country: France
- Region: Auvergne-Rhône-Alpes
- Department: Ain
- Arrondissement: Belley
- Canton: Belley

Government
  - Mayor (2026–32): Pascal Demange
- Area^{1}: 3.55 km^{2} (1.37 sq mi)
- Elevation: 358 m (1,175 ft)
- Highest elevation: 503 m (1,650 ft)
- Lowest elevation: 309 m (1,014 ft)
- Population (2023): 162
  - Density: 45.6/km^{2} (118/sq mi)
- Time zone: UTC+01:00 (CET)
  - Summer (DST): UTC+02:00 (CEST)
- INSEE/Postal code: 01234 /01300
- ^{1} French Land Register data, which excludes lakes, ponds, glaciers > 1 km^{2} (0.386 sq mi or 247 acres) and river estuaries.

Marignieu (French pronunciation: [maʁiɲø]) is a commune in the Ain department in eastern France.

== Population ==
Historical population
Year	Pop.	±% p.a.
1968	114	—
1975	127	+1.55%
1982	141	+1.51%
1990	138	−0.27%
1999	156	+1.37%
2007	160	+0.32%
2012	156	−0.51%
2017	172	+1.97%
2023	162	−0.99%
Source: INSEE

== See also ==
- Communes of the Ain department
