= Ceyzérieu =

Commune in Auvergne-Rhône-Alpes, France

- Commune
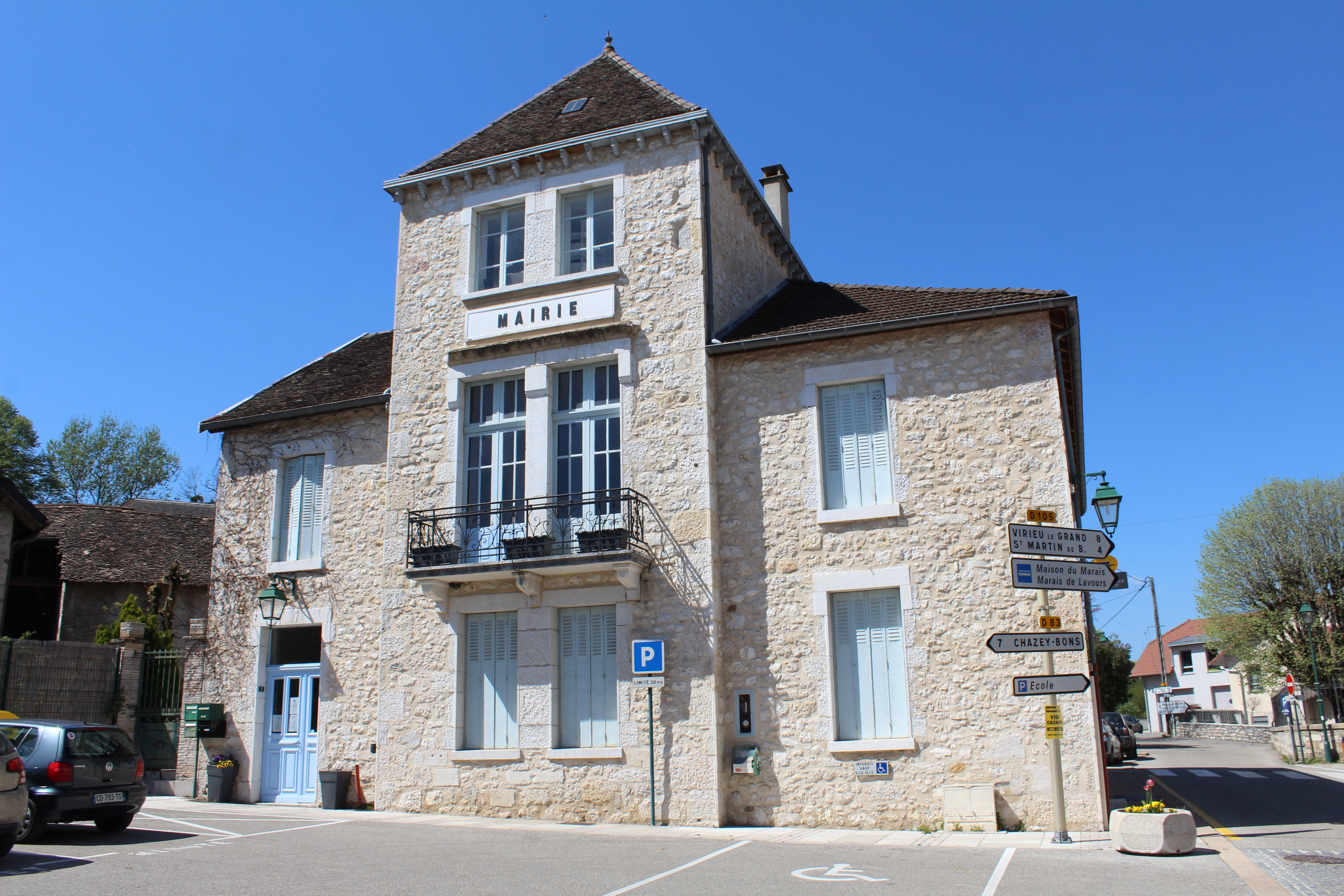
- Town hall

- Coat of arms
- Location of Ceyzérieu
- Location within France Location within Auvergne-Rhône-Alpes
- Coordinates: 45°50′07″N 5°43′36″E
- Country: France
- Region: Auvergne-Rhône-Alpes
- Department: Ain
- Arrondissement: Belley
- Canton: Belley
- Intercommunality: Bugey Sud

Government
  - Mayor (2026–32): Myriam Keller
- Area^{1}: 19.72 km^{2} (7.61 sq mi)
- Elevation: 280 m (920 ft)
- Highest elevation: 444 m (1,457 ft)
- Lowest elevation: 226 m (741 ft)
- Population (2023): 1,064
  - Density: 53.96/km^{2} (139.7/sq mi)
- Time zone: UTC+01:00 (CET)
  - Summer (DST): UTC+02:00 (CEST)
- INSEE/Postal code: 01073 /01350
- ^{1} French Land Register data, which excludes lakes, ponds, glaciers > 1 km^{2} (0.386 sq mi or 247 acres) and river estuaries.

Ceyzérieu (French pronunciation: [sɛzeʁjø]) is a commune in the Ain department in eastern France.

== Population ==
Historical population
Year	Pop.	±% p.a.
1968	649	—
1975	648	−0.02%
1982	727	+1.66%
1990	766	+0.66%
1999	814	+0.68%
2007	884	+1.04%
2012	979	+2.06%
2017	1,007	+0.57%
2023	1,064	+0.92%
Source: INSEE

== See also ==
- Communes of the Ain department
- Lac de Chavoley
- Lac de Morgnieu
