= La Burbanche =

Commune in Auvergne-Rhône-Alpes, France

- Commune
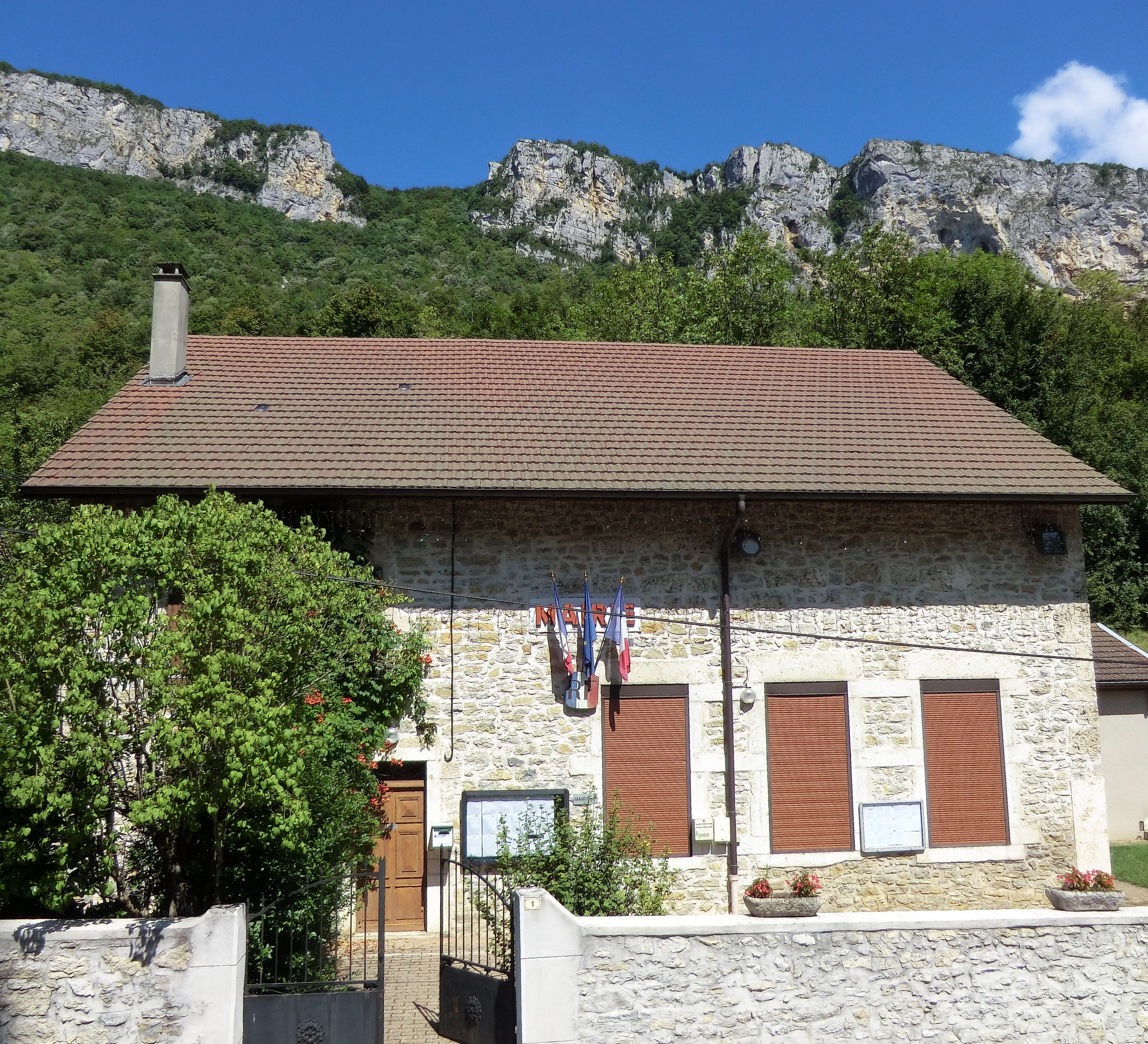
- Town hall
- Location of La Burbanche
- Location within France Location within Auvergne-Rhône-Alpes
- Coordinates: 45°51′00″N 5°34′00″E
- Country: France
- Region: Auvergne-Rhône-Alpes
- Department: Ain
- Arrondissement: Belley
- Canton: Belley
- Intercommunality: Bugey Sud

Government
  - Mayor (2026–32): Patrick Marie
- Area^{1}: 10.82 km^{2} (4.18 sq mi)
- Elevation: 350 m (1,150 ft)
- Highest elevation: 860 m (2,820 ft)
- Lowest elevation: 334 m (1,096 ft)
- Population (2023): 98
  - Density: 9.1/km^{2} (23/sq mi)
- Time zone: UTC+01:00 (CET)
  - Summer (DST): UTC+02:00 (CEST)
- INSEE/Postal code: 01066 /01510
- ^{1} French Land Register data, which excludes lakes, ponds, glaciers > 1 km^{2} (0.386 sq mi or 247 acres) and river estuaries.

La Burbanche (French pronunciation: [la byʁbɑ̃ʃ]) is a commune in the Ain department in eastern France.

== Population ==
Historical population
| Year | Pop. | ±% p.a. |
|---|---|---|
| 1968 | 80 | — |
| 1975 | 61 | −3.80% |
| 1982 | 55 | −1.47% |
| 1990 | 60 | +1.09% |
| 1999 | 56 | −0.76% |
| 2007 | 65 | +1.88% |
| 2012 | 73 | +2.35% |
| 2017 | 77 | +1.07% |
| 2023 | 98 | +4.10% |
Source: INSEE

== See also ==
- Communes of the Ain department
- Lacs des Hôpitaux
