= Cuzieu, Ain =

Commune in Auvergne-Rhône-Alpes, France

Cuzieu
- Commune
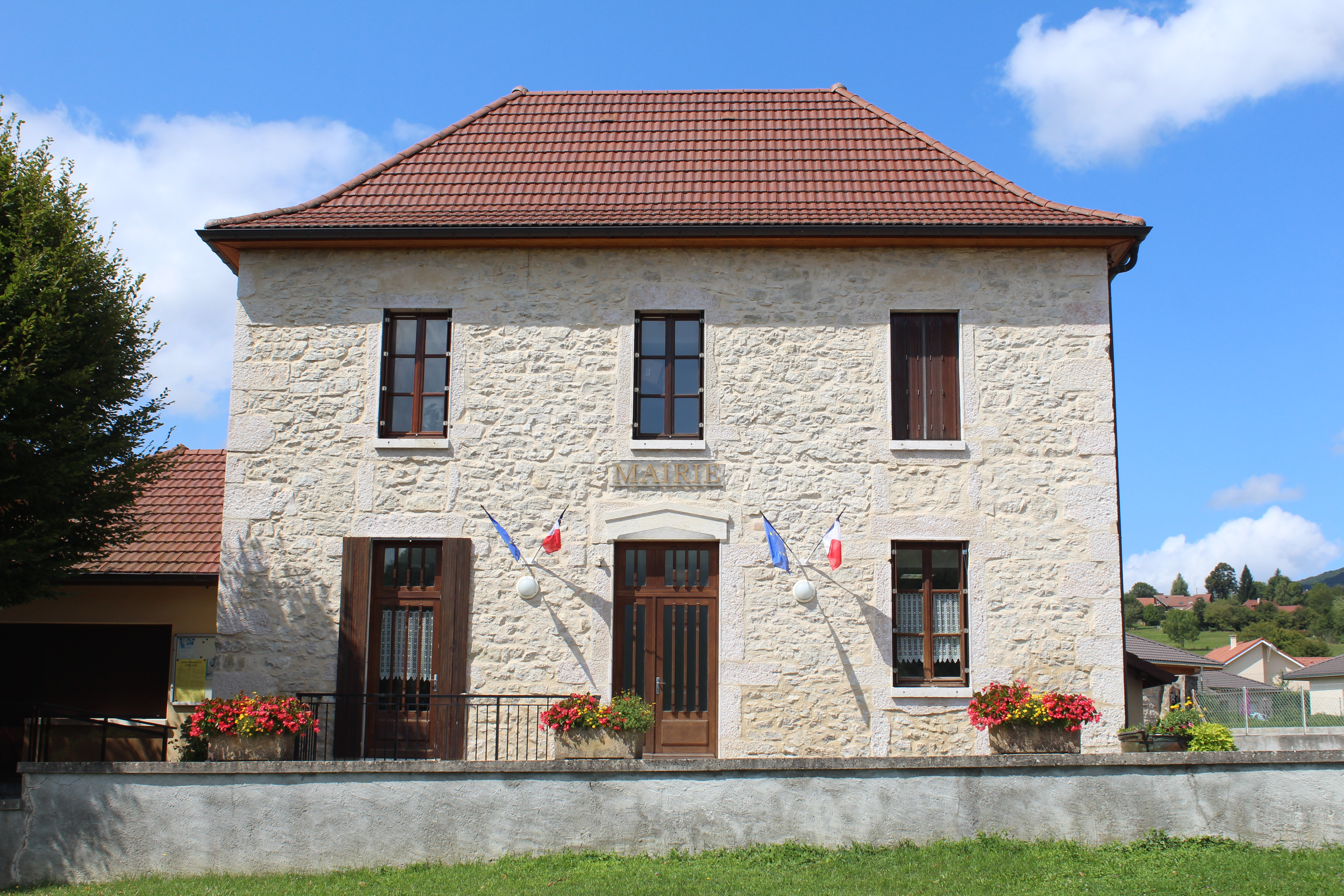
- Town hall

- Coat of arms
- Location of Cuzieu
- Location within France Location within Auvergne-Rhône-Alpes
- Coordinates: 45°49′05″N 5°41′07″E
- Country: France
- Region: Auvergne-Rhône-Alpes
- Department: Ain
- Arrondissement: Belley
- Canton: Belley

Government
  - Mayor (2026–32): Laurence Crosnier
- Area^{1}: 4.87 km^{2} (1.88 sq mi)
- Elevation: 350 m (1,150 ft)
- Highest elevation: 449 m (1,473 ft)
- Lowest elevation: 260 m (850 ft)
- Population (2023): 424
  - Density: 87.1/km^{2} (225/sq mi)
- Time zone: UTC+01:00 (CET)
  - Summer (DST): UTC+02:00 (CEST)
- INSEE/Postal code: 01141 /01300
- ^{1} French Land Register data, which excludes lakes, ponds, glaciers > 1 km^{2} (0.386 sq mi or 247 acres) and river estuaries.

Cuzieu (French pronunciation: [kyzjø]) is a commune in the Ain department in eastern France.

== Population ==
Historical population
Year	Pop.	±% p.a.
1968	143	—
1975	156	+1.25%
1982	193	+3.09%
1990	240	+2.76%
1999	304	+2.66%
2007	385	+3.00%
2012	410	+1.27%
2017	448	+1.79%
2023	424	−0.91%
Source: INSEE

== See also ==
- Communes of the Ain department
