= Virieu-le-Grand =

Commune in Auvergne-Rhône-Alpes, France

Virieu-le-Grand Veriô (Arpitan)
- Commune
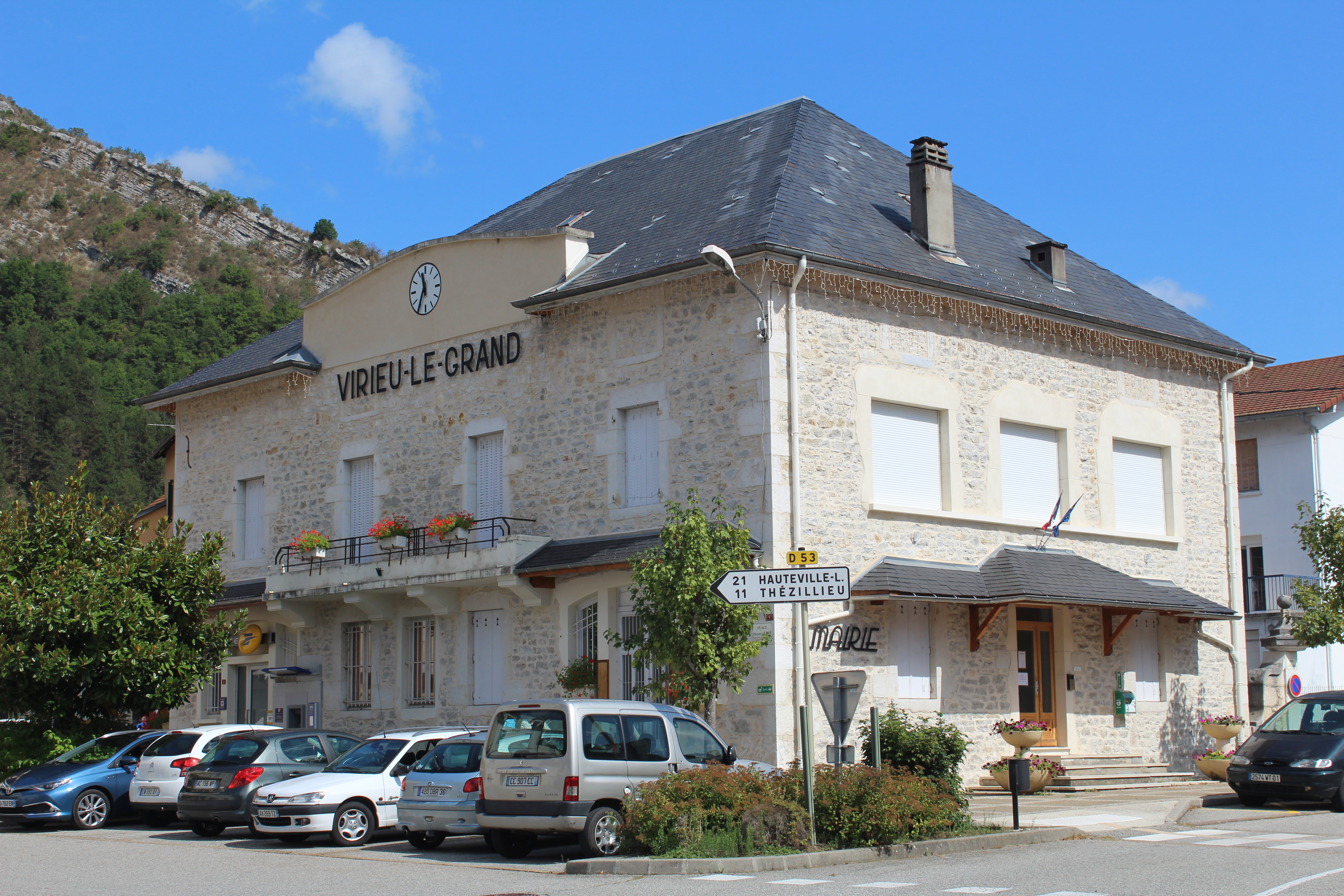
- Town hall

- Coat of arms
- Location of Virieu-le-Grand
- Location within France Location within Auvergne-Rhône-Alpes
- Coordinates: 45°51′N 5°39′E
- Country: France
- Region: Auvergne-Rhône-Alpes
- Department: Ain
- Arrondissement: Belley
- Canton: Belley

Government
  - Mayor (2026–32): Yvette Vallin
- Area^{1}: 12.55 km^{2} (4.85 sq mi)
- Elevation: 267 m (876 ft)
- Highest elevation: 1,059 m (3,474 ft)
- Lowest elevation: 241 m (791 ft)
- Population (2023): 1,111
  - Density: 88.53/km^{2} (229.3/sq mi)
- Time zone: UTC+01:00 (CET)
  - Summer (DST): UTC+02:00 (CEST)
- INSEE/Postal code: 01452 /01510
- ^{1} French Land Register data, which excludes lakes, ponds, glaciers > 1 km^{2} (0.386 sq mi or 247 acres) and river estuaries.

Virieu-le-Grand (French pronunciation: [viʁjø lə ɡʁɑ̃]; Arpitan: Veriô [və.ˈrjau]) is a commune in the Ain department in eastern France.

== Population ==
Historical population
Year	Pop.	±% p.a.
1968	879	—
1975	874	−0.08%
1982	920	+0.74%
1990	922	+0.03%
1999	949	+0.32%
2007	1,063	+1.43%
2012	1,141	+1.43%
2017	1,081	−1.07%
2023	1,111	+0.46%
Source: INSEE

== See also ==
- Communes of the Ain department
- Lac de Virieu
