= Contrevoz =

Commune in Auvergne-Rhône-Alpes, France

- Commune
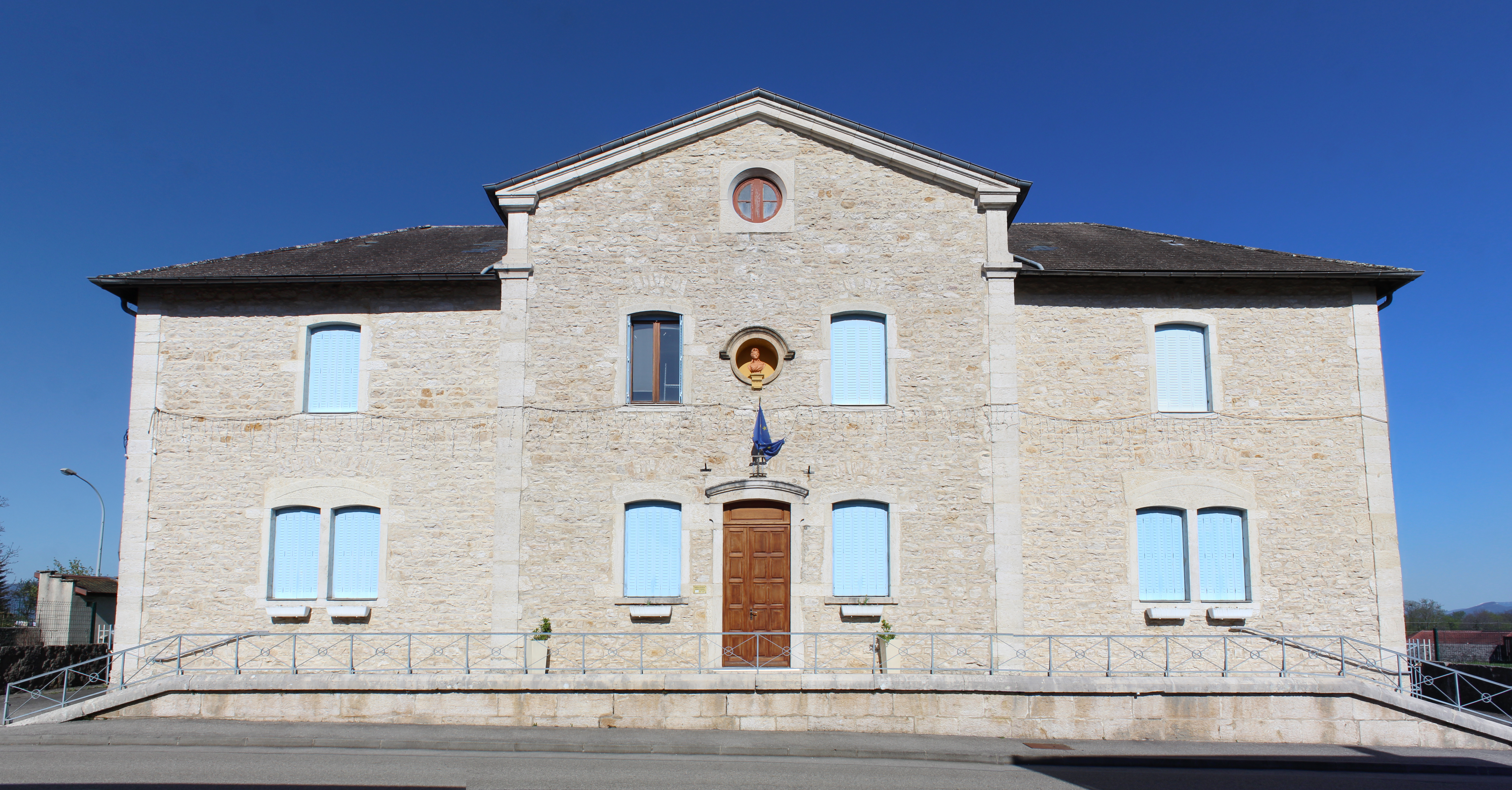
- Town hall
- Location of Contrevoz
- Location within France Location within Auvergne-Rhône-Alpes
- Coordinates: 45°48′16″N 5°37′44″E
- Country: France
- Region: Auvergne-Rhône-Alpes
- Department: Ain
- Arrondissement: Belley
- Canton: Belley
- Intercommunality: Bugey Sud

Government
  - Mayor (2026–32): Jean-Daniel Balastrier
- Area^{1}: 14.18 km^{2} (5.47 sq mi)
- Elevation: 325 m (1,066 ft)
- Highest elevation: 1,217 m (3,993 ft)
- Lowest elevation: 266 m (873 ft)
- Population (2023): 494
  - Density: 34.8/km^{2} (90.2/sq mi)
- Time zone: UTC+01:00 (CET)
  - Summer (DST): UTC+02:00 (CEST)
- INSEE/Postal code: 01116 /01300
- ^{1} French Land Register data, which excludes lakes, ponds, glaciers > 1 km^{2} (0.386 sq mi or 247 acres) and river estuaries.

Contrevoz (French pronunciation: [kɔ̃tʁəvo]) is a commune in the Ain department in eastern France.

== Population ==
Historical population
Year	Pop.	±% p.a.
1968	297	—
1975	289	−0.39%
1982	376	+3.83%
1990	416	+1.27%
1999	430	+0.37%
2007	483	+1.46%
2012	528	+1.80%
2017	499	−1.12%
2023	494	−0.17%
Source: INSEE

== See also ==
- Communes of the Ain department
- Lac de Chailloux
