= Joseph Carrara =

French cyclist (1938–2024)

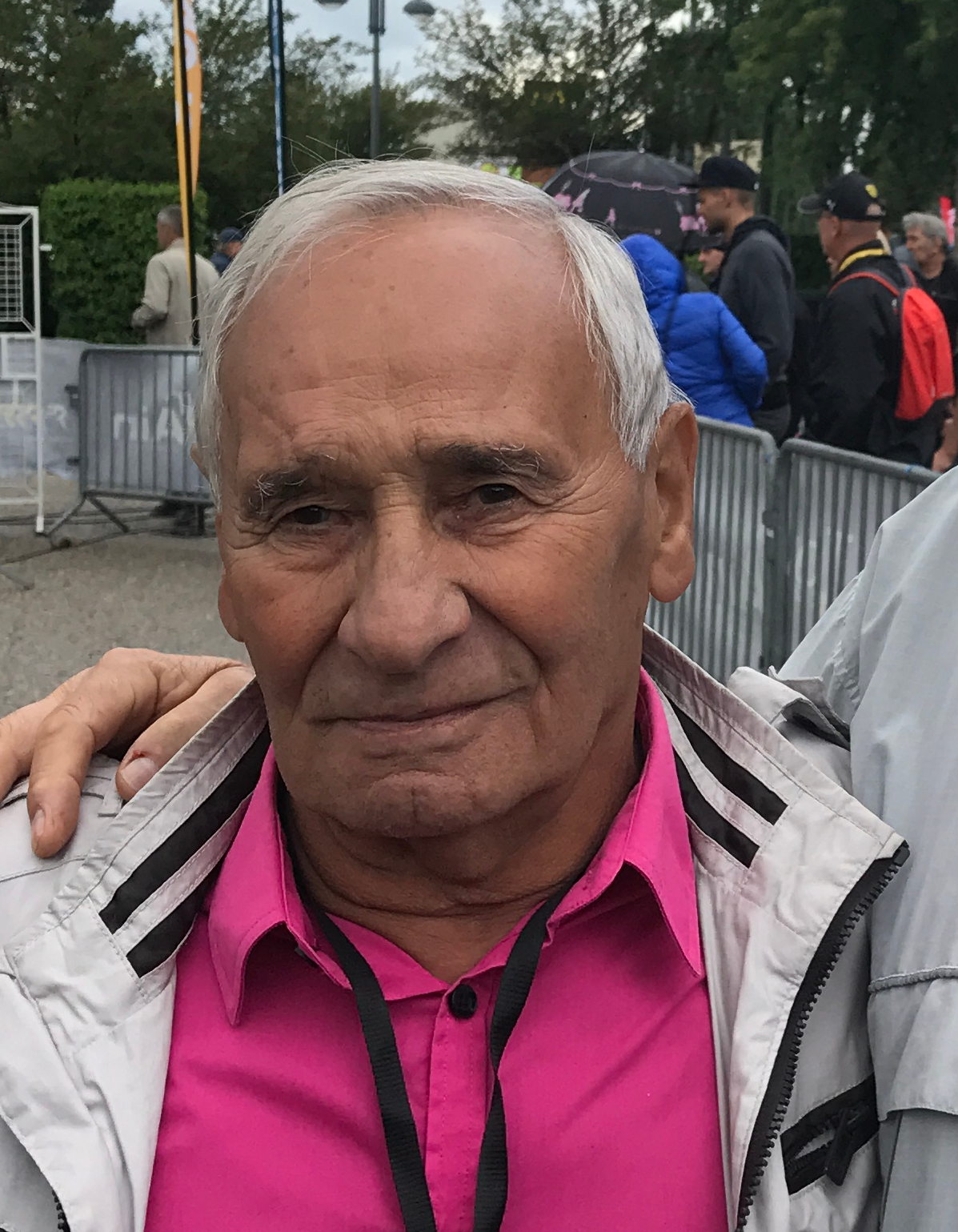
- Carrara in 2017

Personal information
- Born: 9 March 1938 Hauteville-Lompnes, France
- Died: 13 July 2024 (aged 86) Cormaranche-en-Bugey, France

Cycling career
- Sport: Cycling
- Role: Rider

Joseph Carrara (9 March 1938 – 13 July 2024) was a French racing cyclist. He won stage 5 of the 1962 Giro d'Italia. Carrara died in Cormaranche-en-Bugey on 13 July 2024, at the age of 86.
