= Plateau d'Hauteville =

Commune in Auvergne-Rhône-Alpes, France

- Commune
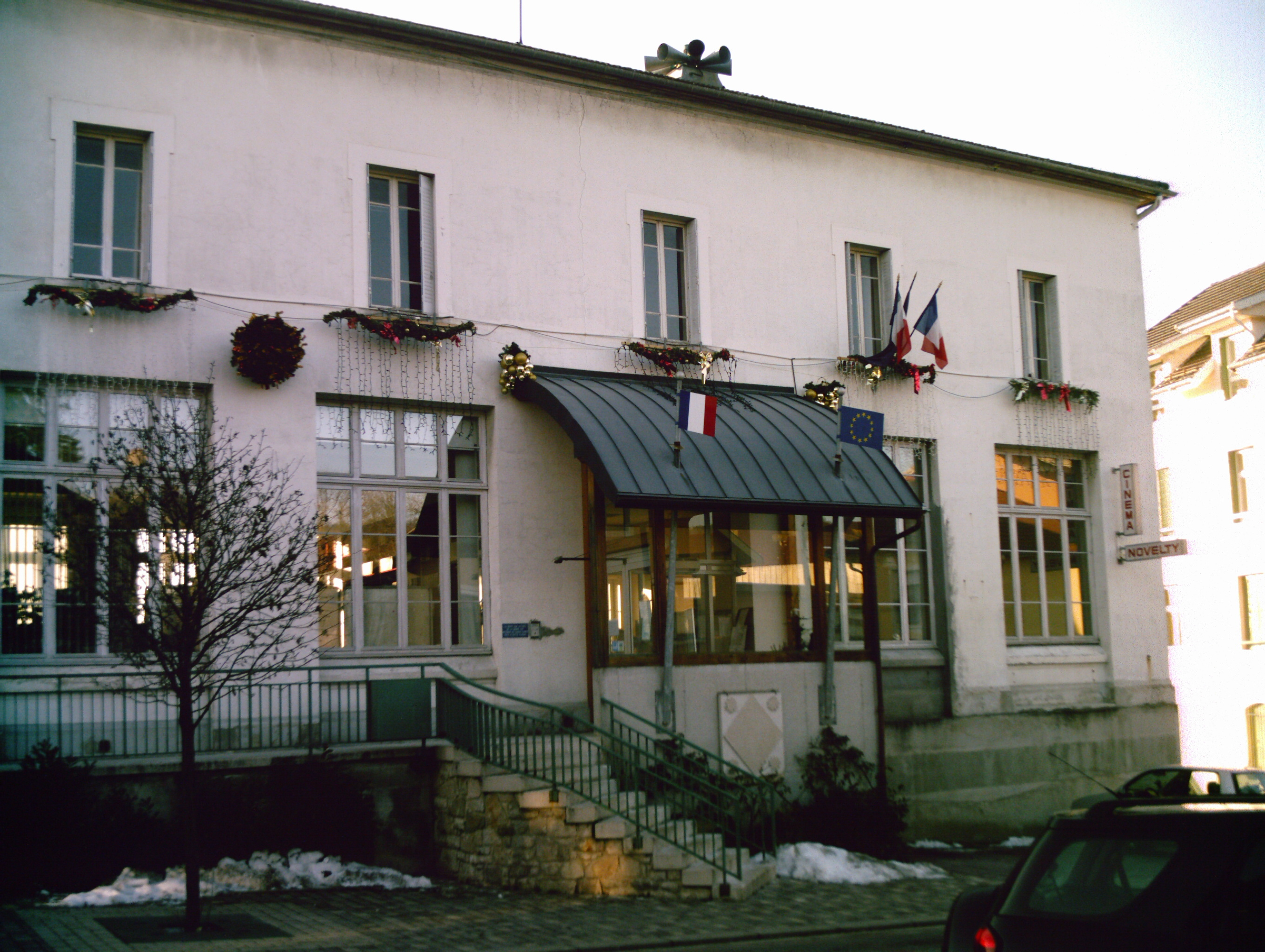
- Town hall
- Location of Plateau d'Hauteville
- Location within France Location within Auvergne-Rhône-Alpes
- Coordinates: 45°58′38″N 5°36′06″E
- Country: France
- Region: Auvergne-Rhône-Alpes
- Department: Ain
- Arrondissement: Belley
- Canton: Plateau d'Hauteville
- Intercommunality: Haut-Bugey Agglomération

Government
  - Mayor (2020–2026): Philippe Emin
- Area^{1}: 106.11 km^{2} (40.97 sq mi)
- Highest elevation: 1,241 m (4,072 ft)
- Lowest elevation: 455 m (1,493 ft)
- Population (2023): 4,857
  - Density: 45.77/km^{2} (118.6/sq mi)
- Time zone: UTC+01:00 (CET)
  - Summer (DST): UTC+02:00 (CEST)
- INSEE/Postal code: 01185 /01110
- ^{1} French Land Register data, which excludes lakes, ponds, glaciers > 1 km^{2} (0.386 sq mi or 247 acres) and river estuaries.

Plateau d'Hauteville (French pronunciation: [plato dotvil]) is a commune in the Ain department in eastern France. The municipality was established on 1 January 2019 by merger of the former communes of Cormaranche-en-Bugey, Hauteville-Lompnes (the seat), Hostiaz and Thézillieu.

== Geography ==
The river Albarine flows through the commune.

=== Climate ===
Plateau d'Hauteville has an oceanic climate (Köppen climate classification Cfb). The average annual temperature in Plateau d'Hauteville is 8.4 °C (47.1 °F). The average annual rainfall is 1,564.4 mm (61.59 in) with November as the wettest month. The temperatures are highest on average in July, at around 17.1 °C (62.8 °F), and lowest in January, at around 0.3 °C (32.5 °F). The highest temperature ever recorded in Plateau d'Hauteville was 35.7 °C (96.3 °F) on 12 August 2003; the coldest temperature ever recorded was −22.4 °C (−8.3 °F) on 1 March 2005.

Climate data for Hauteville-Lompnes, Plateau d'Hauteville, elevation 805 m (2,641 ft), (1981–2010 averages, extremes 1989−2017)
Month	Jan	Feb	Mar	Apr	May	Jun	Jul	Aug	Sep	Oct	Nov	Dec	Year
Record high °C (°F)	16.4 (61.5)	19.1 (66.4)	22.2 (72.0)	25.5 (77.9)	30.0 (86.0)	34.0 (93.2)	34.4 (93.9)	35.7 (96.3)	28.7 (83.7)	25.1 (77.2)	21.1 (70.0)	17.2 (63.0)	35.7 (96.3)
Mean daily maximum °C (°F)	5.2 (41.4)	6.5 (43.7)	10.1 (50.2)	12.8 (55.0)	18.0 (64.4)	21.3 (70.3)	23.8 (74.8)	23.7 (74.7)	18.7 (65.7)	14.6 (58.3)	8.5 (47.3)	5.1 (41.2)	14.1 (57.4)
Daily mean °C (°F)	0.3 (32.5)	1.3 (34.3)	4.4 (39.9)	7.1 (44.8)	11.8 (53.2)	14.8 (58.6)	17.1 (62.8)	16.9 (62.4)	12.7 (54.9)	9.4 (48.9)	4.0 (39.2)	0.7 (33.3)	8.4 (47.1)
Mean daily minimum °C (°F)	−4.5 (23.9)	−4.0 (24.8)	−1.3 (29.7)	1.4 (34.5)	5.7 (42.3)	8.4 (47.1)	10.4 (50.7)	10.1 (50.2)	6.7 (44.1)	4.1 (39.4)	−0.5 (31.1)	−3.6 (25.5)	2.8 (37.0)
Record low °C (°F)	−21.0 (−5.8)	−22.3 (−8.1)	−22.4 (−8.3)	−9.2 (15.4)	−3.0 (26.6)	−1.2 (29.8)	1.4 (34.5)	0.8 (33.4)	−3.2 (26.2)	−9.6 (14.7)	−15.3 (4.5)	−20.7 (−5.3)	−22.4 (−8.3)
Average precipitation mm (inches)	122.9 (4.84)	128.4 (5.06)	117.3 (4.62)	128.1 (5.04)	124.5 (4.90)	100.4 (3.95)	109.8 (4.32)	117.5 (4.63)	139.5 (5.49)	156.8 (6.17)	167.5 (6.59)	151.7 (5.97)	1,564.4 (61.59)
Average precipitation days (≥ 1.0 mm)	11.1	11.0	10.7	11.4	12.1	10.1	9.6	9.8	9.7	12.0	12.4	12.2	132.0
Source: Meteociel

== Population ==
Population data refer to the commune in its geography as of January 2025.

Historical population
Year	Pop.	±% p.a.
1968	4,766	—
1975	4,868	+0.30%
1982	4,516	−1.07%
1990	4,952	+1.16%
1999	4,749	−0.46%
2007	5,350	+1.50%
2012	5,135	−0.82%
2017	4,853	−1.12%
2023	4,857	+0.01%
Source: INSEE

== See also ==
- Communes of the Ain department
