= Thézillieu =

Part of Plateau d'Hauteville in Auvergne-Rhône-Alpes, France

- Part of Plateau d'Hauteville
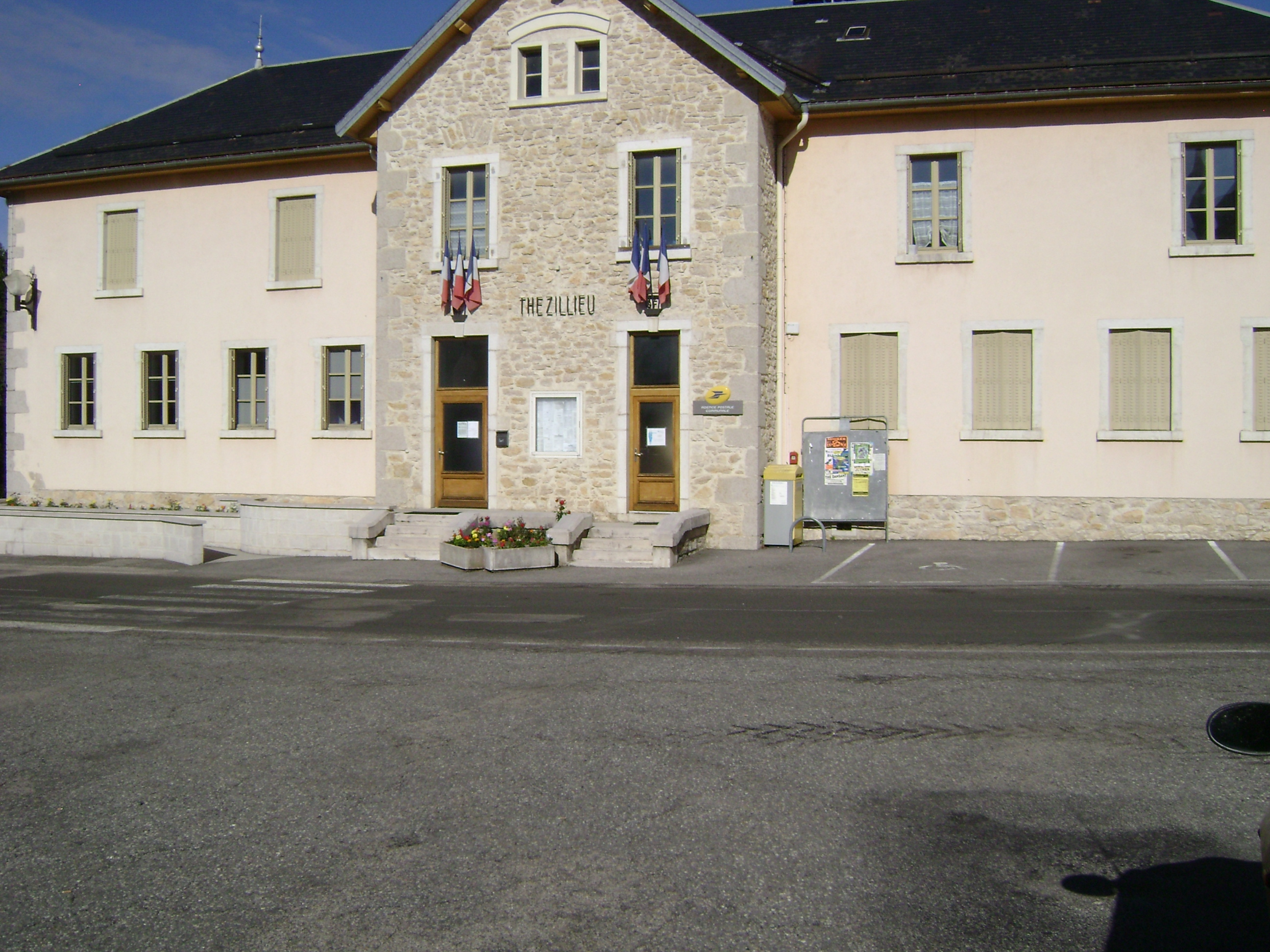

- Coat of arms
- Location of Thézillieu
- Location within France Location within Auvergne-Rhône-Alpes
- Coordinates: 45°53′34″N 5°36′03″E
- Country: France
- Region: Auvergne-Rhône-Alpes
- Department: Ain
- Arrondissement: Belley
- Canton: Plateau d'Hauteville
- Commune: Plateau d'Hauteville
- Area^{1}: 26.25 km^{2} (10.14 sq mi)
- Elevation: 860 m (2,820 ft)
- Highest elevation: 1,123 m (3,684 ft)
- Lowest elevation: 706 m (2,316 ft)
- Population (2022): 306
  - Density: 11.7/km^{2} (30.2/sq mi)
- Time zone: UTC+01:00 (CET)
  - Summer (DST): UTC+02:00 (CEST)
- Postal code: 01110
- ^{1} French Land Register data, which excludes lakes, ponds, glaciers > 1 km^{2} (0.386 sq mi or 247 acres) and river estuaries.

Thézillieu (French pronunciation: [teziljø]) is a former commune in the Ain department in eastern France. On 1 January 2019, it was merged into the new commune of Plateau d'Hauteville.

== Population ==
Historical population
Year	Pop.	±% p.a.
2006	310	—
2011	321	+0.70%
2015	300	−1.68%
2022	306	+0.28%
Source: INSEE

== See also ==
- Communes of the Ain department
