= Henriette d'Angeville =

French mountain climber

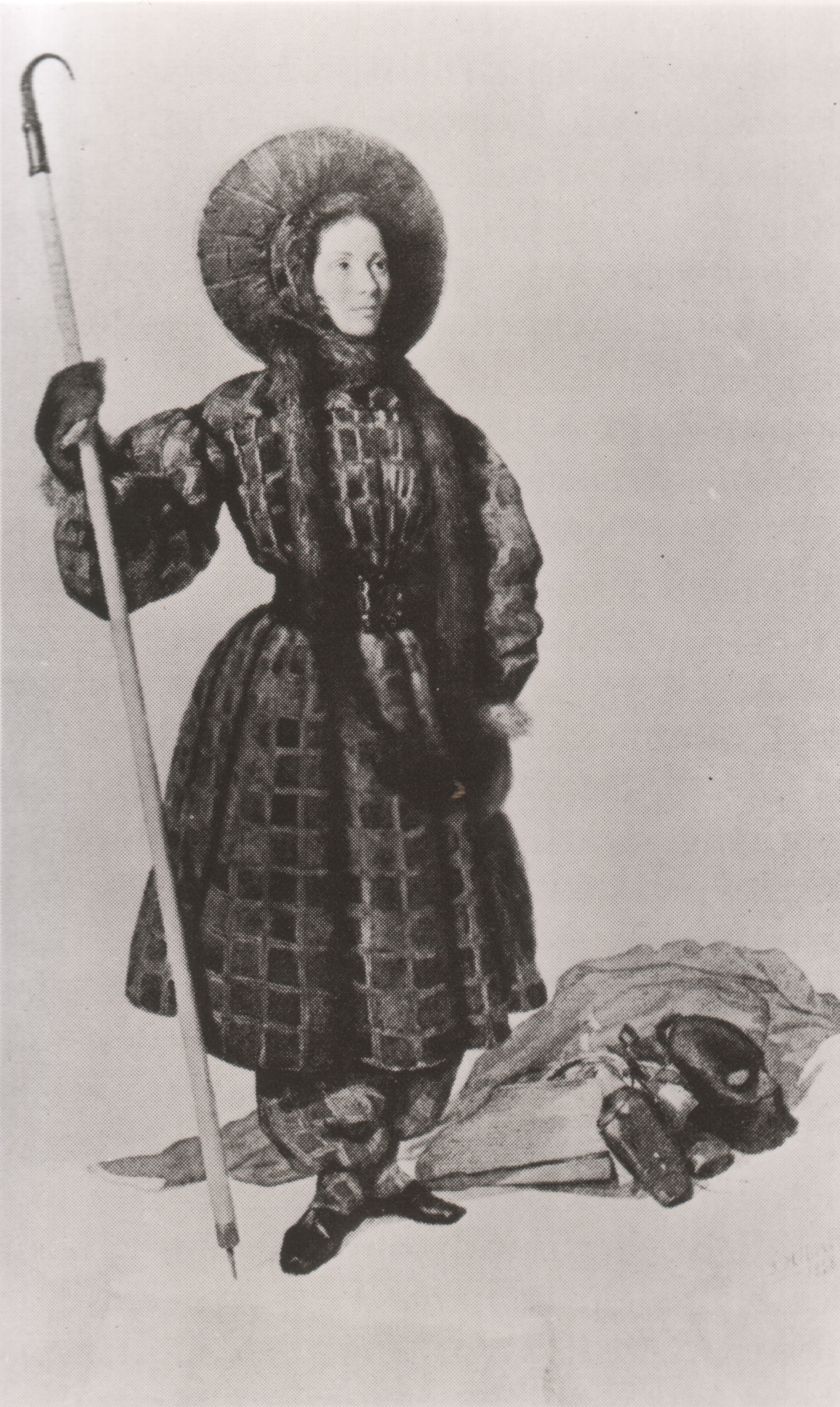
Henriette d'Angeville

Henriette d'Angeville (10 March 1794 in Semur-en-Auxois – 13 January 1871 in Lausanne) was the second woman to climb Mont Blanc, and the first to do so unaided (meaning that, although male guides showed her the way up the mountain and carried her supplies, they did not carry her. The first woman to summit the mountain had had to be carried by the guides over certain rough spots.)

== Biography ==
Henriette d'Angeville was a descendant of a French aristocratic family. After the French Revolution, her father was imprisoned and her grandfather executed, and the family moved to Bugey in the Rhône-Alpes region. After her father's death, in 1827, she settled in Geneva. An avid walker, for a long time she longed to climb Mont Blanc and finally did so in 1838, becoming the first woman since Maria Paradis in 1808 to climb Western Europe's highest mountain.

D'Angeville continued to climb for twenty-five years, scaling twenty-one more peaks, as well as again summiting Mont Blanc. Her last Alpine ascent was on Oldenhorn, at age 65. In her later years she also became interested in speleology and founded a museum of mineralogy in Lausanne, where she died.

== Mont Blanc expedition ==
D'Angeville set off for Mont Blanc in 1838, in the company of Joseph-Marie Couttet, five other guides, and six porters. A suggestion had been made by the guides to join with two all-male groups, but d'Angeville declined. Her arrival in Chamonix created quite a stir; crowds cheered her on her way to the mountain. She received a social call at the Grand Mulets, at 10,000 feet, from a Polish nobleman (who sent his card to her tent), and an English group joined them as well.

D'Angeville's party left for the summit on 4 September 1838 at 2 AM. Along the way d'Angeville proved herself strong and agile enough; particularly on rock she climbed as well as the men, though she did suffer from heart palpitations and drowsiness. The party reached the top of the mountain at 1:15 PM. Toasts were made with champagne, doves were released from the summit to announce their success, and d'Angeville was hoisted on the men's shoulders and cheered. A cannon salute welcomed them on their return to Chamonix. The celebrations the next day also included a special guest, at d'Angeville's request, the now sixty-year-old Maria Paradis. Also present in Chamonix during that time, though he left the day before d'Angeville's successful climb, was a young, poor, and hopeful author and mountaineer Albert Richard Smith. Smith had tried to attach himself to an expedition but would not climb the mountain until 1851, after which he turned his experience into a theatrical show; he notes d'Angeville's expedition (and the "Polish gentleman [sic]") in his "Ascent of Mont Blanc."

== Recognition ==
Since Paradis, according to her own account, was partly carried up by her guides, d'Angeville is often referred to as the first woman to reach Mont Blanc's summit with her own strength. A street is named for Henriette d'Angeville in Hauteville-Lompnès, near the Angeville castle, acquired by the Angeville family in 1657 and inhabited by Henriette's brother. She is mentioned by Harriet Beecher Stowe in her travel memoir Sunny Memories of Foreign Lands; Stowe had toured extensively through the Alps and had met both Maria Paradis (whom she calls "Marie de Mont Blanc") and d'Angeville, in Geneva.

== Bibliography ==
- d'Angeville, Henriette (1987). Mon excursion au Mont-Blanc. Arthaud. ISBN 978-2-7003-0664-4.
- Brown, Rebecca A. (2002). Women on High: Pioneers of Mountaineering. Appalachian Mountain Club Books. ISBN 1-929173-13-X.
- Domain, Guy (29 July 2010). "Hauteville-Lompnes: La Rue Centrale, un condensé de l'histoire de la station". Le Progrès. Archived from the original on 31 July 2010.
- Grabne, Martin (30 July 2010). "Der Berg ist eine Frau". Der Standard.
- Mazel, David (1994). Mountaineering women: stories by early climbers. Texas A&M UP. ISBN 978-0-89096-617-4.
- Riley, Glenda (1999). Women and nature: saving the "Wild" West. U of Nebraska P. p. 33. ISBN 978-0-8032-8975-8.
- Smith, Albert (March 1852). "Ascent of Mont Blanc". The Eclectic Magazine of Foreign Literature, Science, and Art: 391–408.
- Stowe, Harriet Beecher (1854). Sunny memories of foreign lands, Vol. 2. Phillips, Sampson.
