= Hostiaz =

Part of Plateau d'Hauteville in Auvergne-Rhône-Alpes, France

- Part of Plateau d'Hauteville
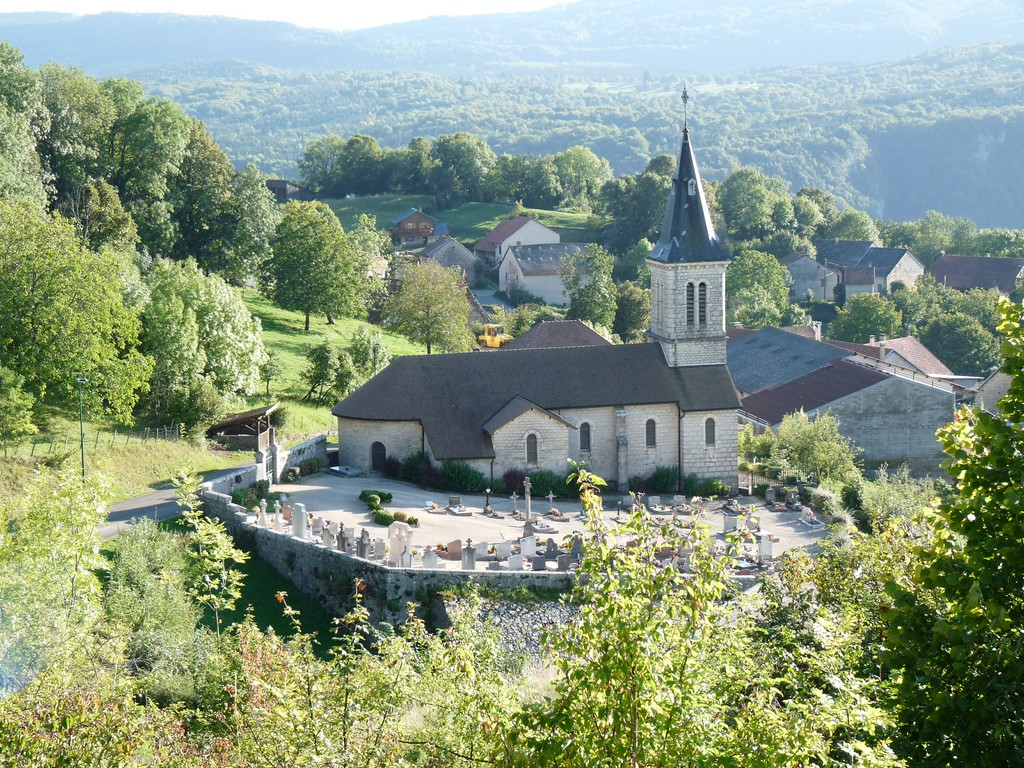
- Location of Hostiaz
- Location within France Location within Auvergne-Rhône-Alpes
- Coordinates: 45°54′06″N 5°32′04″E
- Country: France
- Region: Auvergne-Rhône-Alpes
- Department: Ain
- Arrondissement: Belley
- Canton: Plateau d'Hauteville
- Commune: Plateau d'Hauteville
- Area^{1}: 10.6 km^{2} (4.1 sq mi)
- Elevation: 750 m (2,460 ft)
- Highest elevation: 1,086 m (3,563 ft)
- Lowest elevation: 680 m (2,230 ft)
- Population (2022): 92
  - Density: 8.7/km^{2} (22/sq mi)
- Time zone: UTC+01:00 (CET)
  - Summer (DST): UTC+02:00 (CEST)
- Postal code: 01110
- ^{1} French Land Register data, which excludes lakes, ponds, glaciers > 1 km^{2} (0.386 sq mi or 247 acres) and river estuaries.

Hostiaz (French pronunciation: [ɔstja]; formerly Hostias) is a former commune in the Ain department in eastern France. On 1 January 2019, it was merged into the new commune of Plateau d'Hauteville.

== Population ==
Historical population
Year	Pop.	±% p.a.
2006	76	—
2011	83	+1.78%
2015	87	+1.18%
2022	92	+0.80%
Source: INSEE

== See also ==
- Communes of the Ain department
