= Marie Paradis =

First woman to climb Mont Blanc

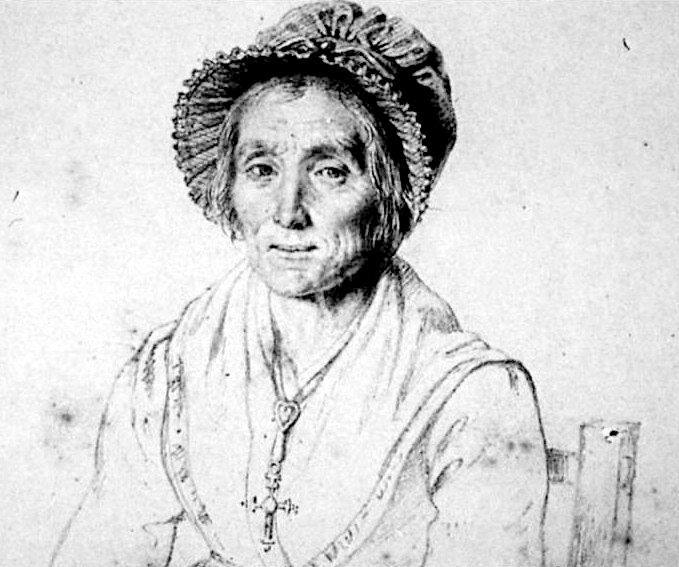
Marie Paradis

Marie Paradis (c. 1778 – 1839) was the first woman to climb Mont Blanc.

Paradis was a poor maidservant who lived in Chamonix at that time part of the Kingdom of Sardinia. On 14 July 1808, in the company of renowned mountain guide Jacques Balmat, she became the first woman to climb Mont Blanc, Western Europe's highest mountain. The party camped on the Grands Mulets, and during the final ascent Paradis became fatigued and was assisted by her guides. On the summit, Paradis was in such poor condition that she had difficulty breathing, was unable to speak, and could not see. Exhausted and quite undone by her efforts, she begged her companions to throw her into the nearest crevasse to end her misery. Mark Twain reports that she took her boyfriend with her, a detail not found in other sources. In 1809 she recorded her experience in an "admirably graphic and picturesque" account. Le Blond reports that Paradis made "quite a fortune" out of her achievement.

Afterwards she was known as "Maria de Mont Blanc"; Charles Edward Mathews notes, in The Annals of Mont Blanc, that after her own successful climb she would leave refreshments for others who attempted Mont Blanc. The second woman to climb Mont Blanc did so thirty years after her; when Henriette d'Angeville celebrated her successful ascent in Chamonix, she was congratulated by Paradis who had received her special, personal invitation.

Much of what has been reported about Paradis comes from Alexandre Dumas, Henriette d'Angeville, and Mark Twain. Their encounters with her story, however, came 24, 32 and 70 years after the fact, respectively. Dumas wrote a fairly long passage about Paradis in Impressions de Voyage: Suisse, which chronicled his travels through the Chamonix valley in 1832. As critics have pointed out, Dumas was prone to embellishment. Moreover, he reports the date of Paradis's ascent as having occurred in 1811, despite the fact that the person who recounted the details to him was in Marie’s climbing party.

Though these historical accounts paint a picture of Paradis being essentially dragged to the summit, they may not be entirely accurate. In an essay published in the 1826 edition of The New Monthly Magazine and Literary Journal, climbers Dr. Edmund John Clark and Captain Markham Sherwill present a slightly different perspective in one of their footnotes. “On arriving at the Petit Mulet,” it states, “she was excessively exhausted, and almost fainting with fatigue; yet her resolution was not shaken, and, with a little assistance from her companions, she mounted safely to the summit of Mont Blanc, and redescended unhurt to the valley. Her real name is, Maria Paradis, but since that time she has been invariably called Maria de Mont Blanc.” This account paints a slightly different picture, one that says she may not have been quite as dependent on her fellow climbers as was reported by Dumas and others. Additionally, we can't discount the possibility that she may have experienced altitude sickness, which would explain her lethargy.

== Bibliography ==
- Brown, Rebecca A. (2002). Women on High: Pioneers of Mountaineering. Appalachian Mountain Club Books. ISBN 1-929173-13-X.
- Clark, Edmund; H. H. Jackson (1826). Ascents of Mont Blanc. Colburn's New Monthly Magazine.
- Le Blond, Aubrey (1903). True tales of mountain adventures for non-climbers young and old. Unwin. p. 203.
- Mathews, Charles Edward (1898). The annals of Mont Blanc. Unwin.
- Twain, Mark (1907). A Tramp Abroad. Harper and brothers. ISBN 9781545230541.
