= Cormaranche-en-Bugey =

Part of Plateau d'Hauteville in Auvergne-Rhône-Alpes, France

- Part of Plateau d'Hauteville
- Coat of arms
- Location of Cormaranche-en-Bugey
- Location within France Location within Auvergne-Rhône-Alpes
- Coordinates: 45°57′12″N 5°36′40″E
- Country: France
- Region: Auvergne-Rhône-Alpes
- Department: Ain
- Arrondissement: Belley
- Canton: Plateau d'Hauteville
- Commune: Plateau d'Hauteville
- Area^{1}: 18.92 km^{2} (7.31 sq mi)
- Elevation: 850 m (2,790 ft)
- Highest elevation: 1,241 m (4,072 ft)
- Lowest elevation: 766 m (2,513 ft)
- Population (2022): 789
  - Density: 41.7/km^{2} (108/sq mi)
- Time zone: UTC+01:00 (CET)
  - Summer (DST): UTC+02:00 (CEST)
- Postal code: 01110
- ^{1} French Land Register data, which excludes lakes, ponds, glaciers > 1 km^{2} (0.386 sq mi or 247 acres) and river estuaries.

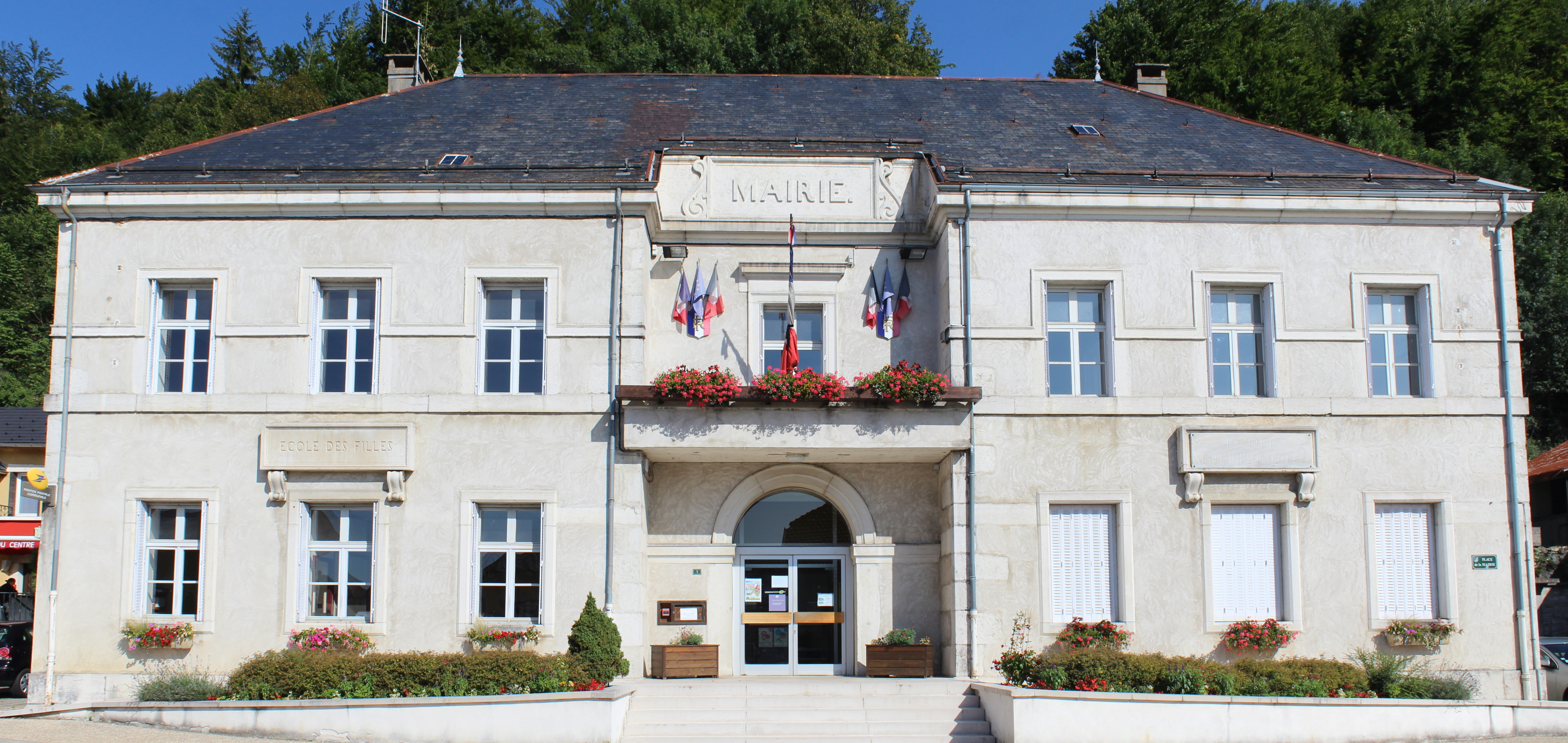
Mairie Cormaranche Bugey

Cormaranche-en-Bugey (French pronunciation: [kɔʁmaʁɑ̃ʃ ɑ̃ byʒɛ], literally Cormaranche in Bugey) is a former commune in the Ain department in eastern France. On 1 January 2019, it was merged into the new commune of Plateau d'Hauteville.

== Population ==
Historical population
Year	Pop.	±% p.a.
2006	835	—
2011	828	−0.17%
2015	803	−0.76%
2022	789	−0.25%
Source: INSEE

== See also ==
- Communes of the Ain department
