= Hauteville-Lompnes =

Part of Plateau d'Hauteville in Auvergne-Rhône-Alpes, France

- Part of Plateau d'Hauteville
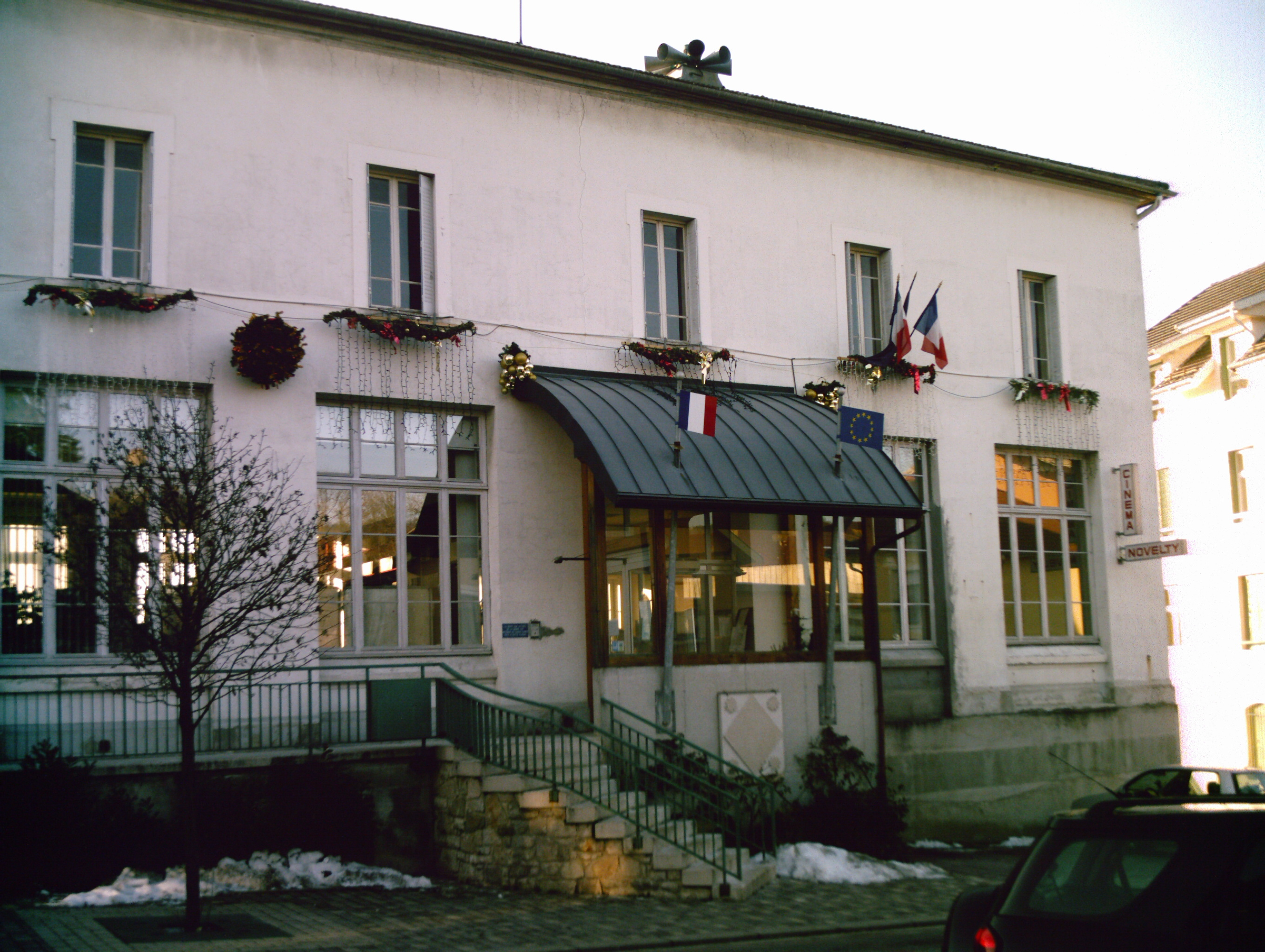
- Town Hall

- Coat of arms
- Location of Hauteville-Lompnes
- Location within France Location within Auvergne-Rhône-Alpes
- Coordinates: 45°58′54″N 5°36′00″E
- Country: France
- Region: Auvergne-Rhône-Alpes
- Department: Ain
- Arrondissement: Belley
- Canton: Plateau d'Hauteville
- Commune: Plateau d'Hauteville
- Area^{1}: 50.34 km^{2} (19.44 sq mi)
- Elevation: 810 m (2,660 ft)
- Highest elevation: 1,240 m (4,070 ft)
- Lowest elevation: 455 m (1,493 ft)
- Population (2022): 3,603
  - Density: 71.57/km^{2} (185.4/sq mi)
- Time zone: UTC+01:00 (CET)
  - Summer (DST): UTC+02:00 (CEST)
- Postal code: 01110
- ^{1} French Land Register data, which excludes lakes, ponds, glaciers > 1 km^{2} (0.386 sq mi or 247 acres) and river estuaries.

Hauteville-Lompnes (French pronunciation: [otvil lɔn]) is a former commune in the Ain department in eastern France. On 1 January 2019, it was merged into the new commune of Plateau d'Hauteville.

== History ==
The commune was formed in 1942 by the union of Hauteville and Lompnes. In 1964 it absorbed the neighbouring communes of Lacoux and Longecombe.

=== Sanatorium Félix Mangini ===
The Sanatorium Félix Mangini was established in 1900 by the industrial entrepreneur Félix Mangini and led by Dr. Frédéric Dumarest, a former student of Carlo Forlanini. It was modeled after a similar clinic at Heiligenschwendi, Switzerland. It was dedicated to the care of tuberculosis patients. Since 1970, it is a centre for functional rehabilitation.

== Geography ==
The river Albarine flows southwestward through the commune's northern part.

== Population ==
Historical population
Year	Pop.	±% p.a.
1968	3,841	—
1975	4,083	+0.88%
1982	3,597	−1.79%
1990	3,895	+1.00%
1999	3,662	−0.68%
2006	4,125	+1.72%
2010	4,044	−0.49%
2015	3,739	−1.56%
2022	3,603	−0.53%
Source: EHESS and INSEE (2010-2022)

== Features ==
Hauteville-Lompnes is famous for its deposits of marble which has been used in the construction of many monumental buildings, among them the Empire State Building in New York City and the Kōkyo Imperial Palace in Tokyo.

A notable feature is the castle d'Angeville, a family possession of the family of that name since 1657. A scion of that family was Henriette d'Angeville, the second woman to climb Mont Blanc, for whom a street in Hauteville is named; her brother, the count d'Angeville, lived in the castle in the mid-nineteenth century.

Today the town is more oriented towards tourism, with cross country and downhill skiing in the winter and range of summertime activities, including walking, hiking and fishing.

== See also ==
- Communes of the Ain department
