= Cantons of the Ain department =

This article presents a list of Cantons in the Ain department of France. Consisting of 49 cantons after the creation of the department structure in 1790, the number was reduced to 32 during the overhaul of the cantonal map in 1801, before increasing over time to 43 due to demographic changes. The cantonal realignment of 2014, applicable from the March 2015 departmental elections, reduced the number of cantons to 23.

== Cantonal realignment of 2014 ==
=== Detailed composition ===
Detailed list of Cantons in the Ain department
#	Canton name	Centralizing office	Population (2018)	Number of communes	Commune composition of the canton
1	Ambérieu-en-Bugey	Ambérieu-en-Bugey	30,257	18	L'Abergement-de-Varey, Ambérieu-en-Bugey, Ambronay, Ambutrix, Arandas, Argis, Bettant, Château-Gaillard, Cleyzieu, Conand, Douvres, Nivollet-Montgriffon, Oncieu, Saint-Denis-en-Bugey, Saint-Maurice-de-Rémens, Saint-Rambert-en-Bugey, Torcieu, Vaux-en-Bugey.
2	Attignat	Attignat	24,762	18	Attignat, Béréziat, Bresse Vallons, Buellas, Confrançon, Curtafond, Foissiat, Jayat, Malafretaz, Marsonnas, Montcet, Montracol, Montrevel-en-Bresse, Polliat, Saint-Didier-d'Aussiat, Saint-Martin-le-Châtel, Saint-Sulpice, Vandeins.
3	Valserhone	Valserhône	21,898	12	Billiat, Champfromier, Chanay, Confort, Giron, Injoux-Génissiat, Montanges, Plagne, Saint Germain-de-Joux, Surjoux-Lhopital, Valserhône, Villes.
4	Belley	Belley	24,679	33	Ambléon, Andert-et-Condon, Arboys en Bugey, Belley, Brégnier-Cordon, Brens, La Burbanche, Ceyzérieu, Chazey-Bons, Cheignieu-la-Balme, Colomieu, Contrevoz, Conzieu, Cressin-Rochefort, Cuzieu, Flaxieu, Groslée-Saint-Benoît, Izieu, Lavours, Magnieu, Marignieu, Massignieu-de-Rives, Murs-et-Gélignieux, Parves et Nattages, Peyrieu, Pollieu, Prémeyzel, Rossillon, Saint-Germain-les-Paroisses, Saint-Martin-de-Bavel, Virieu-le-Grand, Virignin, Vongnes.
5	Bourg-en-Bresse-1	Bourg-en-Bresse	35,368	1 + Part of Bourg-en-Bresse	Viriat. The part of the commune of Bourg-en-Bresse not included in the Canton of Bourg-en-Bresse-2.
6	Bourg-en-Bresse-2	Bourg-en-Bresse	25,779	3 + Part of Bourg-en-Bresse	Péronnas, Saint-Denis-lès-Bourg, Saint-Rémy. The part of the commune of Bourg-en-Bresse located to the west and south of a defined line by an axis of the following tracks and limits: from the territorial limits of the commune of Saint-Denis-lès-Bourg, Bourg—Mâcon railway line, Avenue des Ancies-Combattants, Boulevard Paul-Bert until the Place Perrier-Labalme, Avenue Jean-Marie-Verne, Rue de la Fraternité, Rue Amédée-Fornet, Rue Alfred-de-Vigny, Avenue Jean-Marie-Verne, Boulevard Paul-Valéry, Rue Tony-Ferret, Boulevard de Brou, Bourg-Bellegarde railway line until crossing the Reyssouze river and the Reyssouze until the territorial limits of the commune of Montagnat.
7	Ceyzériat	Ceyzériat	25,961	22	Certines, Ceyzériat, Chalamont, Châtenay, Châtillon-la-Palud, Crans, Dompierre-sur-Veyle, Druillat, Journans, Lent, Montagnat, Le Plantay, Revonnas, Saint-André-sur-Vieux-Jonc, Saint-Just, Saint-Martin-du-Mont, Saint-Nizier-le-Désert, Servas, Tossiat, La Tranclière, Versailleux, Villette-sur-Ain.
8	Châtillon-sur-Chalaronne	Châtillon-sur-Chalaronne	30,182	26	L'Abergement-Clémenciat, La Chapelle-du-Châtelard, Châtillon-sur-Chalaronne, Condeissiat, Dompierre-sur-Chalaronne, Garnerans, Genouilleux, Guéreins, Illiat, Marlieux, Mogneneins, Montceaux, Montmerle-sur-Saône, Neuville-les-Dames, Peyzieux-sur-Saône, Romans, Saint-André-le-Bouchoux, Saint-Didier-sur-Chalaronne, Saint-Étienne-sur-Chalaronne, Saint-Georges-sur-Renon, Saint-Germain-sur-Renon, Saint-Paul-de-Varax, Sandrans, Sulignat, Thoissey, Valeins.
9	Gex	Gex	32,195	7	Cessy, Divonne-les-Bains, Gex, Grilly, Sauverny, Versonnex, Vesancy.
10	Plateau d'Hauteville	Plateau d'Hauteville	22,038	26	Anglefort, Aranc, Armix, Artemare, Arvière-en-Valromey, Brénod, Chaley, Champagne-en-Valromey, Champdor-Corcelles, Chevillard, Condamine, Corbonod, Corlier, Culoz-Béon, Évosges, Haut-Valromey, Izenave, Lantenay, Outriaz, Plateau d'Hauteville, Prémillieu, Seyssel, Talissieu, Tenay, Valromey-sur-Séran, Vieu-d'Izenave.
11	Lagnieu	Lagnieu	34,098	26	Bénonces, Blyes, Briord, Charnoz-sur-Ain, Chazey-sur-Ain, Innimond, Lagnieu, Leyment, Lhuis, Lompnas, Loyettes, Marchamp, Montagnieu, Ordonnaz, Saint-Jean-de-Niost, Saint-Maurice-de-Gourdans, Saint-Sorlin-en-Bugey, Saint-Vulbas, Sainte-Julie, Sault-Brénaz, Seillonnaz, Serrières-de-Briord, Souclin, Villebois, Villieu-Loyes-Mollon.
12	Meximieux	Meximieux	33,254	15	Balan, Béligneux, Bourg-Saint-Christophe, Bressolles, Dagneux, Faramans, Joyeux, Meximieux, Le Montellier, Montluel, Pérouges, Pizay, Rignieux-le-Franc, Saint-Éloi, Sainte-Croix.
13	Miribel	Miribel	28,916	8	Beynost, La Boisse, Miribel, Neyron, Niévroz, Saint-Maurice-de-Beynost, Thil, Tramoyes.
14	Nantua	Nantua	21,409	17	Apremont, Béard-Géovreissiat, Belleydoux, Bellignat, Brion, Charix, Échallon, Géovreisset, Groissiat, Maillat, Martignat, Montréal-la-Cluse, Nantua, Les Neyrolles, Le Poizat-Lalleyriat, Port, Saint-Martin-du-Frêne.
15	Oyonnax	Oyonnax	25,692	2	Arbent, Oyonnax.
16	Pont-d'Ain	Pont-d'Ain	21,997	24	Bolozon, Boyeux-Saint-Jérôme, Ceignes, Cerdon, Challes-la-Montagne, Dortan, Izernore, Jujurieux, Labalme, Leyssard, Matafelon-Granges, Mérignat, Neuville-sur-Ain, Nurieux-Volognat, Peyriat, Poncin, Pont-d'Ain, Priay, Saint-Alban, Saint-Jean-le-Vieux, Samognat, Serrières-sur-Ain, Sonthonnax-la-Montagne, Varambon.
17	Replonges	Replonges	31,020	31	Arbigny, Asnières-sur-Saône, Bâgé-Dommartin, Bâgé-le-Châtel, Boissey, Boz, Chavannes-sur-Reyssouze, Chevroux, Courtes, Curciat-Dongalon, Feillens, Gorrevod, Lescheroux, Mantenay-Montlin, Manziat, Ozan, Pont-de-Vaux, Replonges, Reyssouze, Saint-André-de-Bâgé, Saint-Bénigne, Saint-Étienne-sur-Reyssouze, Saint-Jean-sur-Reyssouze, Saint-Julien-sur-Reyssouze, Saint-Nizier-le-Bouchoux, Saint-Trivier-de-Courtes, Sermoyer, Servignat, Vernoux, Vescours, Vésines.
18	Saint-Étienne-du-Bois	Saint-Étienne-du-Bois	22,490	28	Beaupont, Bény, Bohas-Meyriat-Rignat, Chavannes-sur-Suran, Cize, Coligny, Cormoz, Corveissiat, Courmangoux, Domsure, Drom, Grand-Corent, Hautecourt-Romanèche, Jasseron, Marboz, Meillonnas, Nivigne et Suran, Pirajoux, Pouillat, Ramasse, Saint-Étienne-du-Bois, Salavre, Simandre-sur-Suran, Val-Revermont, Verjon, Villemotier, Villereversure.
19	Saint-Genis-Pouilly	Saint-Genis-Pouilly	36,031	4	Ferney-Voltaire, Ornex, Prévessin-Moëns, Saint-Genis-Pouilly.
20	Thoiry	Thoiry	28,039	16	Challex, Chevry, Chézery-Forens, Collonges, Crozet, Échenevex, Farges, Léaz, Lélex, Mijoux, Péron, Pougny, Saint-Jean-de-Gonville, Ségny, Sergy, Thoiry.
21	Trévoux	Trévoux	33,447	12	Beauregard, Frans, Jassans-Riottier, Massieux, Misérieux, Parcieux, Reyrieux, Saint-Bernard, Saint-Didier-de-Formans, Sainte-Euphémie, Toussieux, Trévoux.
22	Villars-les-Dombes	Villars-les-Dombes	33,511	25	Ambérieux-en-Dombes, Ars-sur-Formans, Baneins, Birieux, Bouligneux, Chaleins, Chaneins, Civrieux, Fareins, Francheleins, Lapeyrouse, Lurcy, Messimy-sur-Saône, Mionnay, Monthieux, Rancé, Relevant, Saint-André-de-Corcy, Saint-Jean-de-Thurigneux, Saint-Marcel, Saint-Trivier-sur-Moignans, Sainte-Olive, Savigneux, Villars-les-Dombes, Villeneuve.
23	Vonnas	Vonnas	24,341	19	Bey, Biziat, Chanoz-Châtenay, Chaveyriat, Cormoranche-sur-Saône, Crottet, Cruzilles-lès-Mépillat, Grièges, Laiz, Mézériat, Perrex, Pont-de-Veyle, Saint-André-d'Huiriat, Saint-Cyr-sur-Menthon, Saint-Genis-sur-Menthon, Saint-Jean-sur-Veyle, Saint-Julien-sur-Veyle, Saint-Laurent-sur-Saône, Vonnas.
			647,634	393	
