= Canton of Thoissey =

Coordinates: 46°10′25″N 4°48′06″E

Thoissey
- Former canton
- Interactive map of Thoissey
- Country: France
- Region: Auvergne-Rhône-Alpes
- Department: Ain
- No. of communes: {{{nbcomm}}}
- Disbanded: 2015
- Area: 120.62 km^{2} (46.57 sq mi)
- Population (2012): 15,587
  - Density: 129.22/km^{2} (334.69/sq mi)

The canton of Thoissey is a former administrative division in eastern France. It was disbanded following the French canton reorganisation which came into effect in March 2015. It consisted of 12 communes, which joined the canton of Châtillon-sur-Chalaronne in 2015. It had 15,587 inhabitants (2012).

The canton comprised 12 communes:

- Garnerans
- Genouilleux
- Guéreins
- Illiat
- Mogneneins
- Montceaux
- Montmerle-sur-Saône
- Peyzieux-sur-Saône
- Saint-Didier-sur-Chalaronne
- Saint-Étienne-sur-Chalaronne
- Thoissey
- Valeins

== Demographics ==
Historical population Canton of Thoissey
Year	1962	1968	1975	1982	1990	1999
Pop.	7,236	7,825	8,105	9,344	10,668	12,005
±%	—	+8.1%	+3.6%	+15.3%	+14.2%	+12.5%
From the year 1962 on: No double counting – residents of multiple communes (e.g. students and military personnel) are counted only once. Source: INSEE

== See also ==
- Cantons of the Ain department
