= L'Abergement-Clémenciat =

Commune in Auvergne-Rhône-Alpes, France

- Commune
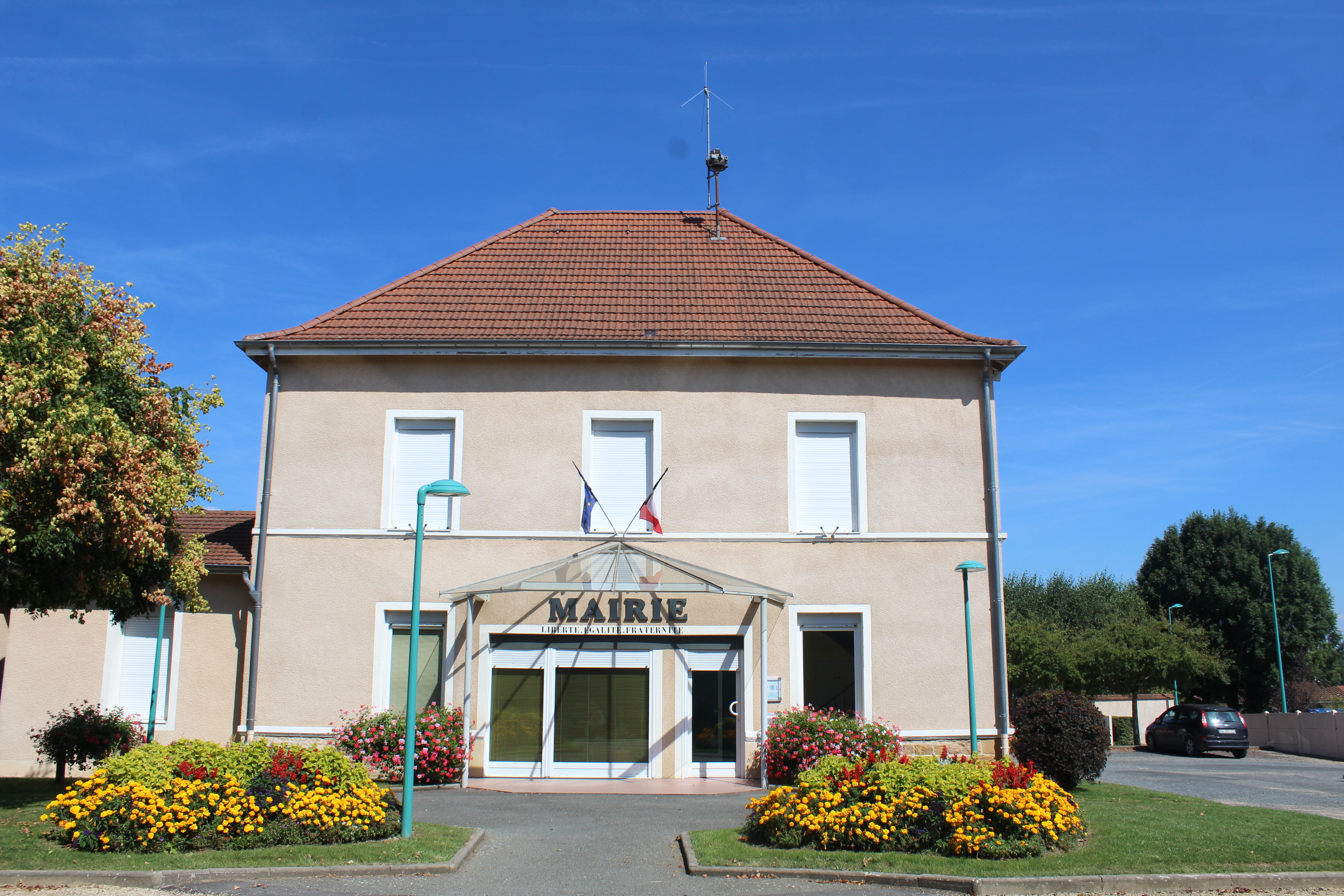
- The town hall in L'Abergement-Clémenciat
- Location of L'Abergement-Clémenciat
- Location within France Location within Auvergne-Rhône-Alpes
- Coordinates: 46°09′07″N 4°55′18″E
- Country: France
- Region: Auvergne-Rhône-Alpes
- Department: Ain
- Arrondissement: Bourg-en-Bresse
- Canton: Châtillon-sur-Chalaronne
- Intercommunality: Dombes

Government
  - Mayor (2026–32): Line Evalet Taponat
- Area^{1}: 15.95 km^{2} (6.16 sq mi)
- Elevation: 240 m (790 ft)
- Highest elevation: 272 m (892 ft)
- Lowest elevation: 206 m (676 ft)
- Population (2023): 860
  - Density: 54/km^{2} (140/sq mi)
- Time zone: UTC+01:00 (CET)
  - Summer (DST): UTC+02:00 (CEST)
- INSEE/Postal code: 01001 /01400
- ^{1} French Land Register data, which excludes lakes, ponds, glaciers > 1 km^{2} (0.386 sq mi or 247 acres) and river estuaries.

L'Abergement-Clémenciat (French pronunciation: [labɛʁʒəmɑ̃ klemɑ̃sja]; Arpitan: L'Abèrgement-Cllèmenciê) is a commune in the department of Ain and the region of Auvergne-Rhône-Alpes in eastern Metropolitan France. The commune was established in 1857 by combining the two parishes of Abergement and Clémenciat.

== Geography ==
L'Abergement-Clémenciat lies on the border between Bresse and Dombes at an altitude of 206 to 272 meters. The commune sits on an area of 1,596 hectares. Other communes near-by include Châtillon-sur-Chalaronne, Illiat, Sulignat, Thoissey, Saint-Étienne-sur-Chalaronne, and Dompierre-sur-Chalaronne. The closest big cities are Lyon, and Geneva.

=== Hydrography ===
- The Chalaronne flows west-northwest through the southern part of the commune.
- The Glenne forms the northern border with the commune of Illiat. It empties into the Chalaronne at Saint-Étienne-sur-Chalaronne
- The Vernisson Canal forms the eastern border with Châtillon-sur-Chalaronne and it empties into the Chalaronne at Pontpeillon.
- The Payon Canal crosses the ash ponds at Châtillon.

== Toponymy ==
There are 4 communes in Ain with "Abergement" in their name. The other three are Le Petit-Abergement, Le Grand-Abergement, and L'Abergement-de-Varey. It seems to designate agricultural concessions in the 11th-15th centuries.

== History ==
It was once a large timber plantation.

== Politics and administration ==
Between 2008 and 2026, Daniel Boulon has been the mayor of L'Abergement-Clémenciat. He was succeeded by Line Evalet Taponat, elected in 2026.

List of successive mayors of L'Abergement-Clémenciat
In office		Name	Party
1857	1882	Antoine-Élisée Munet	
1882	1912	Melchior Munet	
1912	1944	Élisée Munet	
December 1944	February 1945	Paul Reverdy	
February 1945	May 1945	Élisée Munet	
May 1945	October 1947	Jean-Marie Beyoux	Radical Party
November 1947	March 1971	Joseph Jouard	
March 1971	June 1997	René Perret	Independent
June 1997	March 2008	Jean-Claude Rigaud	
March 2008	2026	Daniel Boulon	Independent
2026	Incumbent	Line Evalet Taponat	

== Population ==
Historical population
Year	Pop.	±% p.a.
1968	347	—
1975	368	+0.84%
1982	477	+3.78%
1990	579	+2.45%
1999	728	+2.58%
2007	804	+1.25%
2012	777	−0.68%
2017	776	−0.03%
Source: INSEE

== Sights ==
- The Vieux Bourg (old town) has been classified as a monument historique by the French Ministry of Culture since November 18, 1994. All that remains of the castle is the ruins. The walls of the 14th century enceinte are visible.
- A château, built in 1700, rebuilt in the 19th century
- A church, consecrated in 1868, built under the direction of Louis-Auguste Boileau, an architect of Paris.
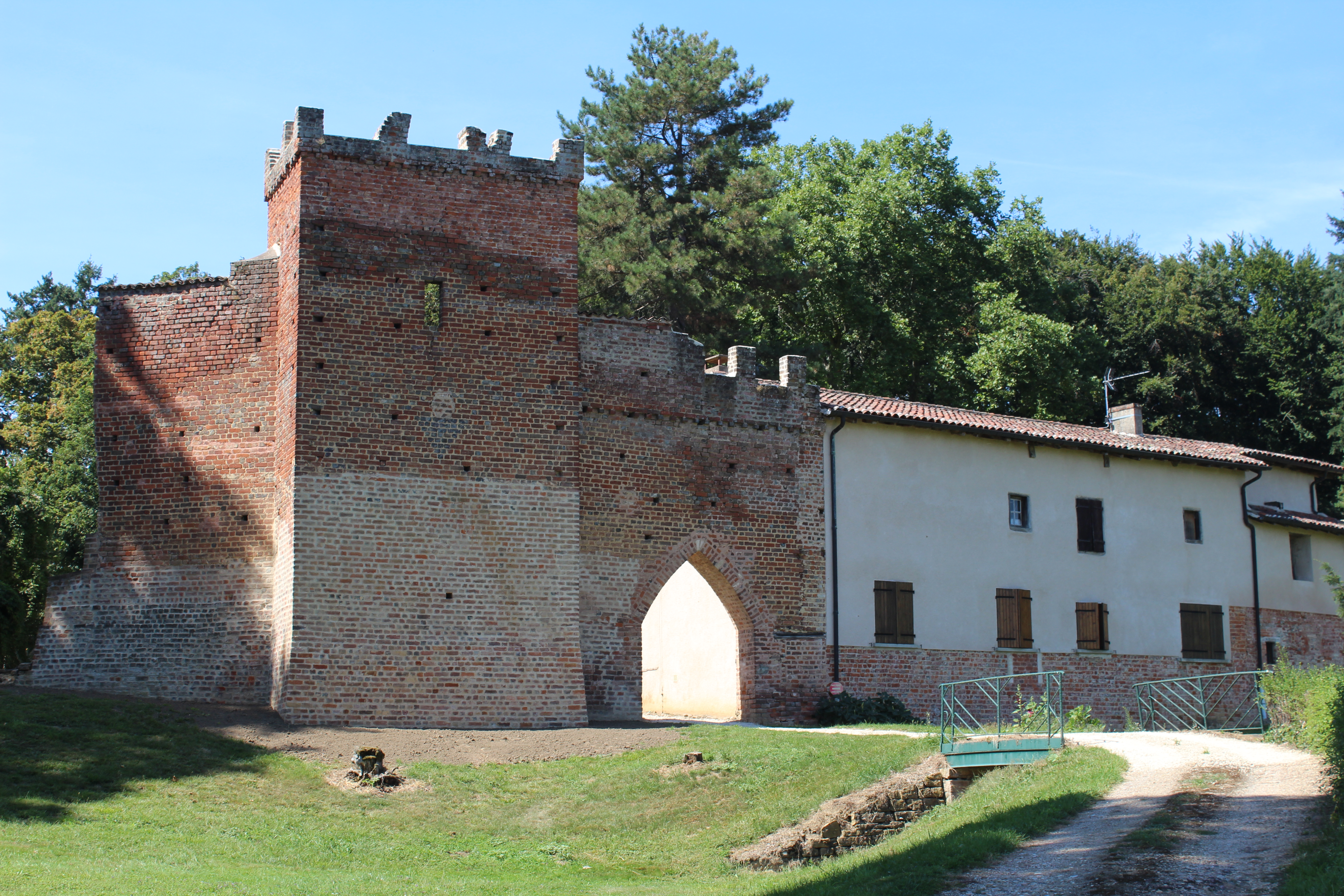
Vieux Bourg.

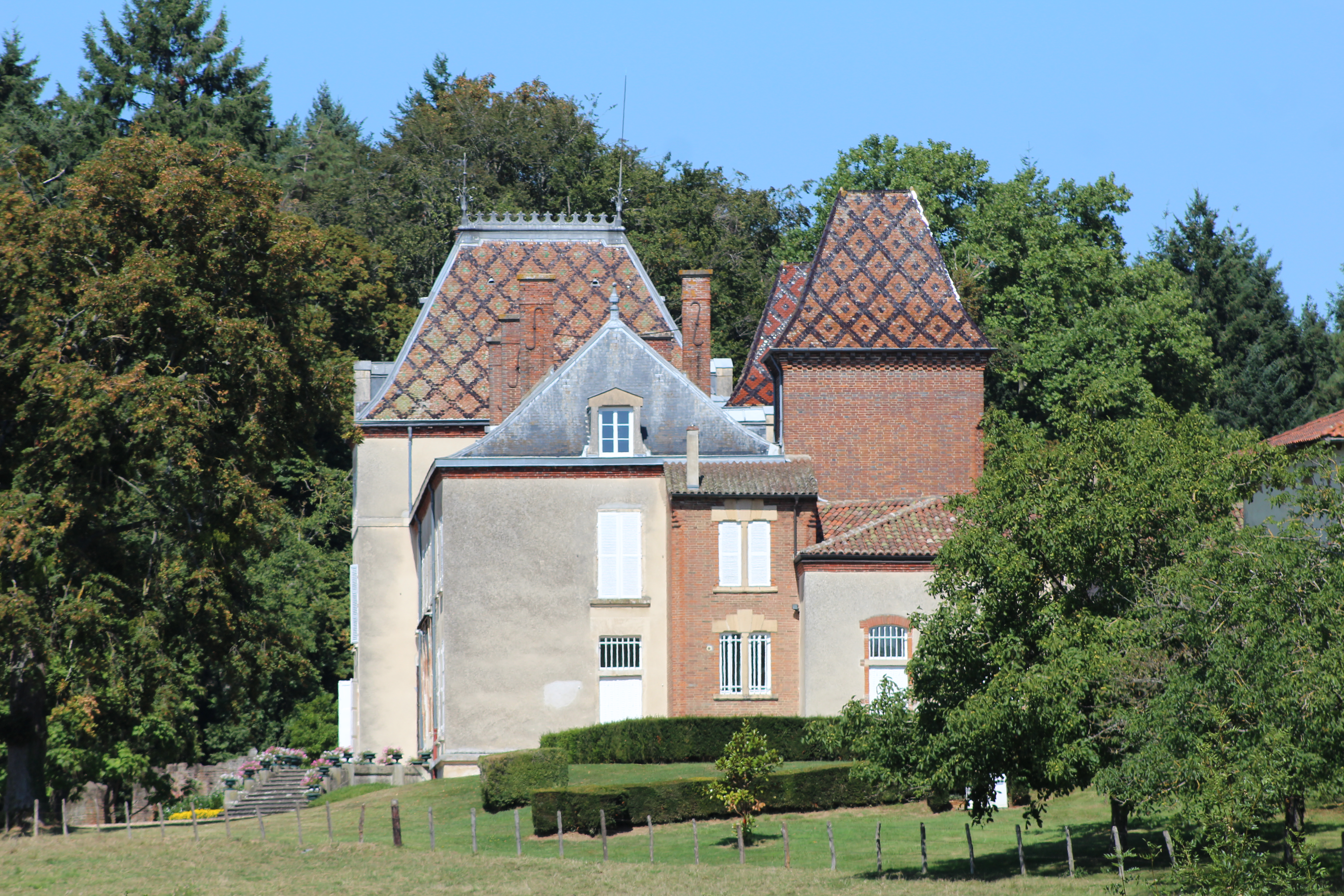
Château Munet.

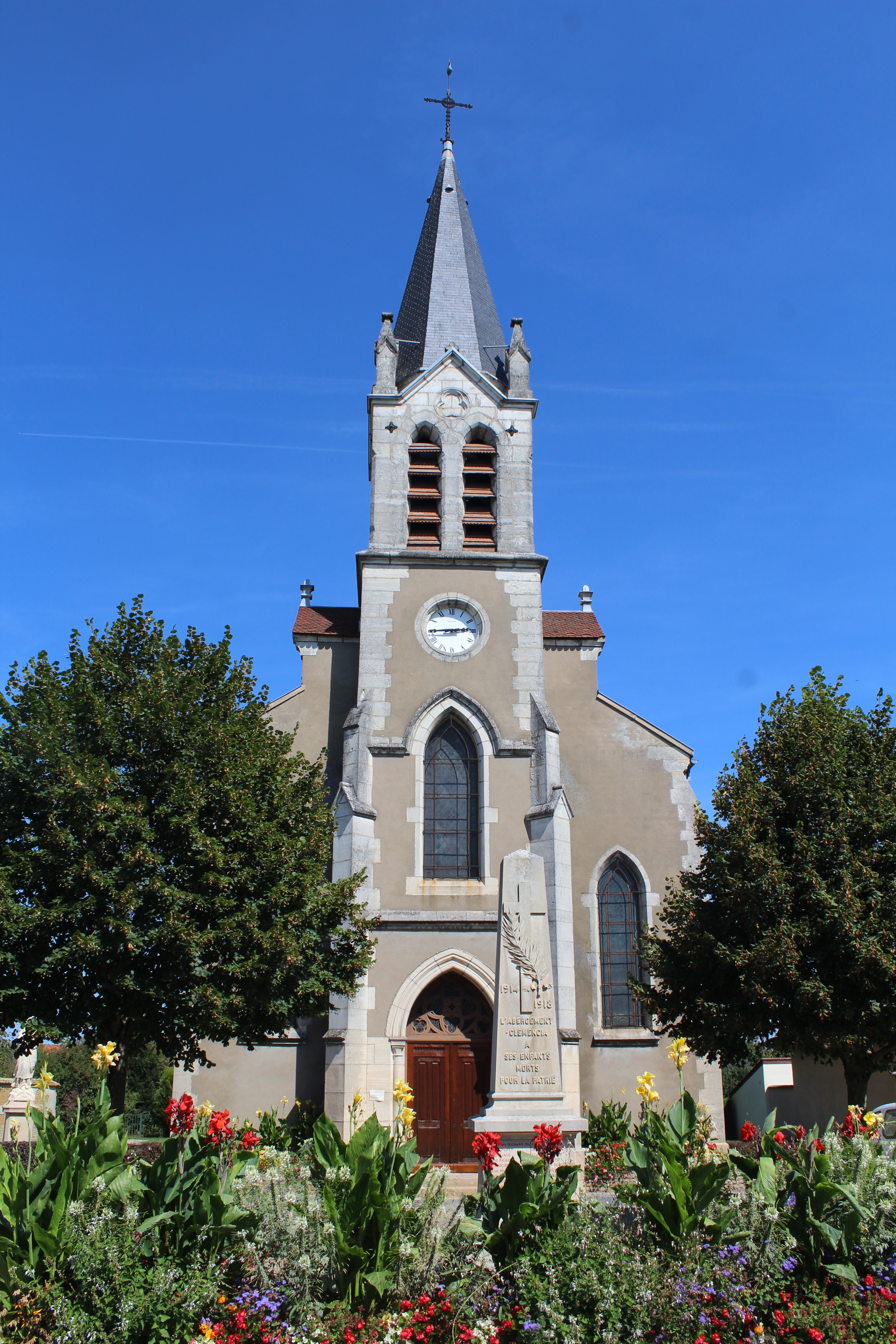
19th century church.

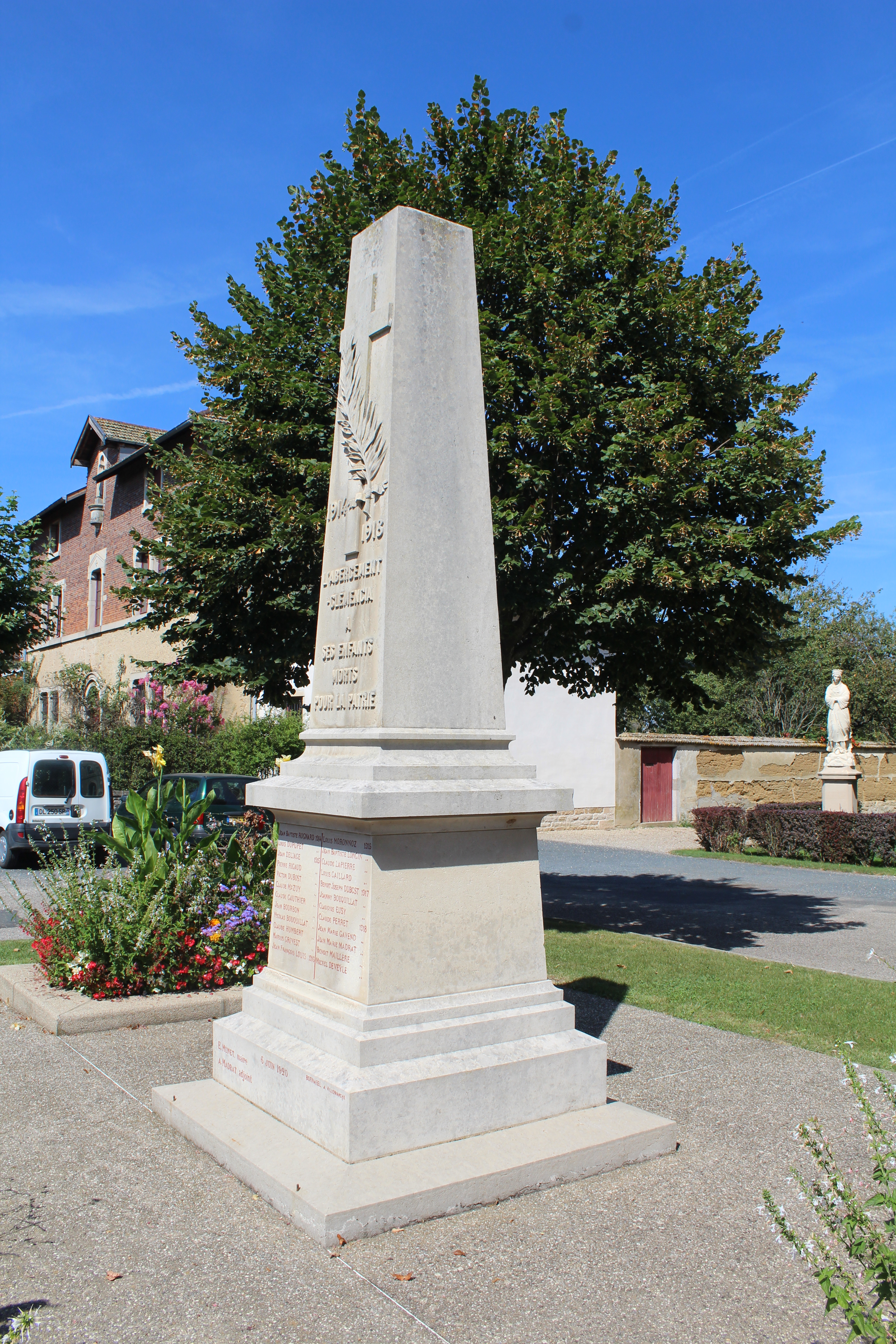
Monument to the dead.

== See also ==
- Communes of the Ain department
