= Romans, Ain =

Commune in Auvergne-Rhône-Alpes, France

Romans
- Commune
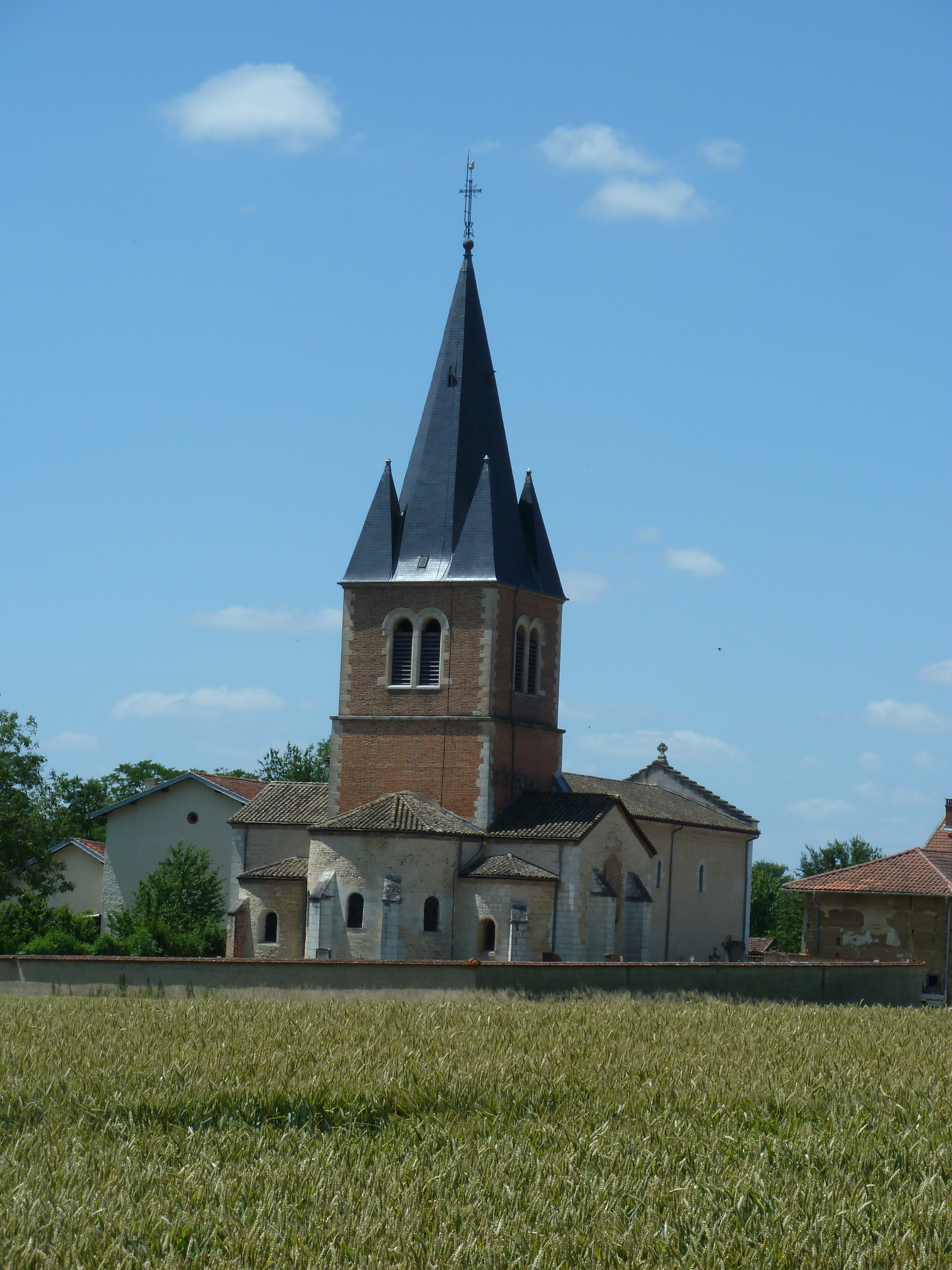
- Saint-Maurice church

- Coat of arms
- Location of Romans
- Location within France Location within Auvergne-Rhône-Alpes
- Coordinates: 46°07′00″N 5°02′00″E
- Country: France
- Region: Auvergne-Rhône-Alpes
- Department: Ain
- Arrondissement: Bourg-en-Bresse
- Canton: Châtillon-sur-Chalaronne

Government
  - Mayor (2026–32): Laurent Perradin
- Area^{1}: 21.8 km^{2} (8.4 sq mi)
- Elevation: 265 m (869 ft)
- Highest elevation: 280 m (920 ft)
- Lowest elevation: 227 m (745 ft)
- Population (2023): 640
  - Density: 29/km^{2} (76/sq mi)
- Time zone: UTC+01:00 (CET)
  - Summer (DST): UTC+02:00 (CEST)
- INSEE/Postal code: 01328 /01400
- ^{1} French Land Register data, which excludes lakes, ponds, glaciers > 1 km^{2} (0.386 sq mi or 247 acres) and river estuaries.

Romans (French pronunciation: [ʁɔmɑ̃]) is a commune in the Ain department in eastern France.

== Geography ==
The village is located between Bresse and the Dombes. The river Renon flows through the commune from southeast to northwest. The other rivers in the area are the Irance in the east of the commune and the Chalaronne forming part of the commune's southwestern border.

== Population ==
Historical population
Year	Pop.	±% p.a.
1968	367	—
1975	346	−0.84%
1982	351	+0.21%
1990	480	+3.99%
1999	522	+0.94%
2007	577	+1.26%
2012	594	+0.58%
2017	590	−0.14%
2023	640	+1.36%
Source: INSEE

== History ==
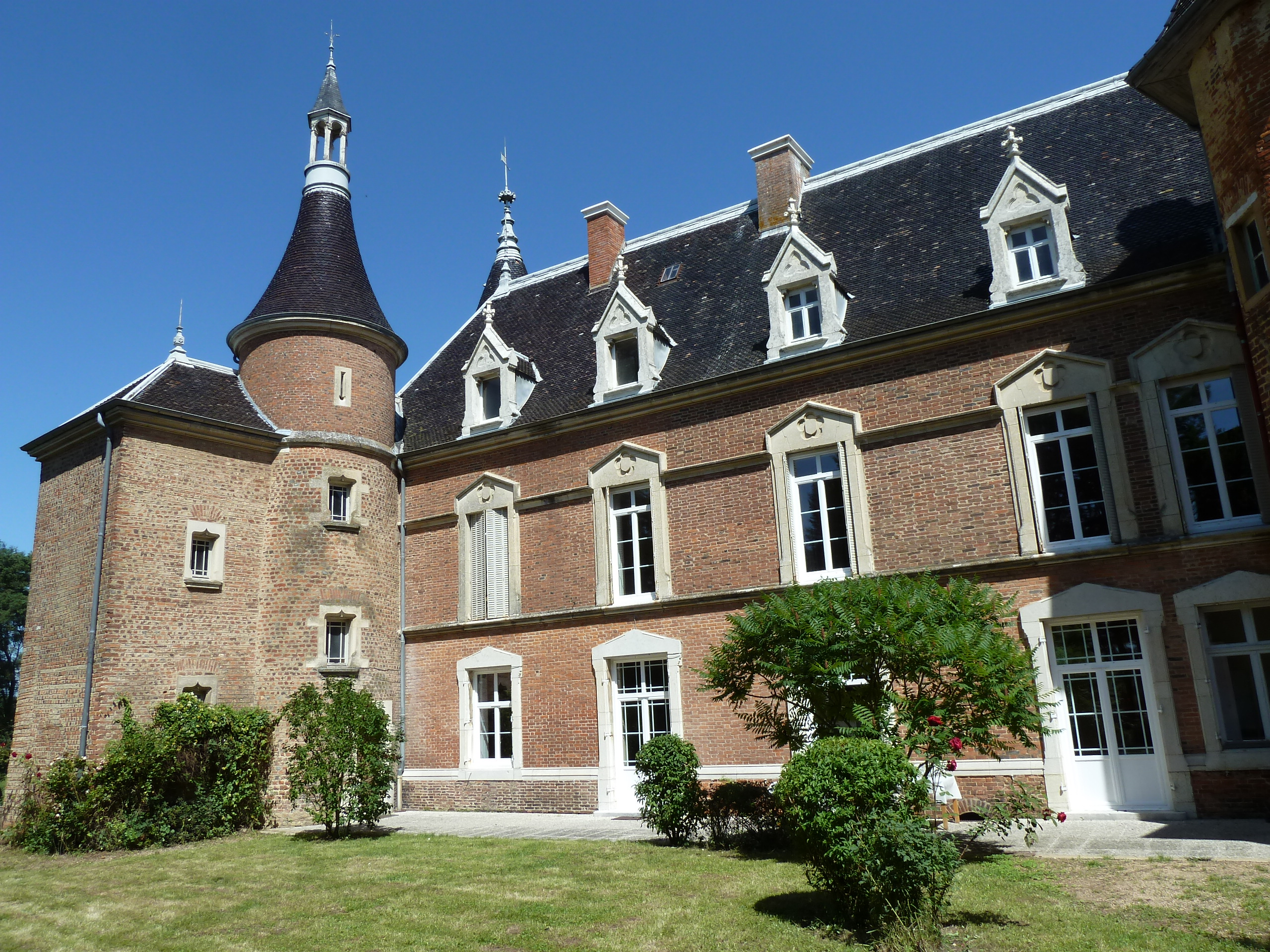
Chateau of Romans

=== Early history ===
The land of Romans became in 917 the property of Cluny Abbey, when it was given by Ingelberge, wife of William I, Duke of Aquitaine who founded Cluny Abbey and the daughter of King Boso of Provence.

Romans was attached the lordship of Varax until it was definitively separated when Étienne de Varax son of Henri Varax the third, married Claudine de Saint Amour in 1396, and created the lordship of Romans.

=== Recent history ===
On 4 March 1718, Claude de Lyobard de Brion, Lord of Romans, sold the land of Romans to Claude César Ferrary, squire and King's Counsellor. Romans was transformed into an earldom named Romans-Ferrari in December 1763 thanks to Etienne-Lambert 1714-1766 (son of Claude César). The last earl of Romans-Ferrari was Charles de Romans-Ferrari, his descendant, born in Romans 16 December 1861, and died 27 June 1912 in Commercy.

== Sights ==
- Saint-Maurice Church : Romanesque 12th-century church. The belltower has been reconstructed between 1856 and 1858.
- The 15th century castle modified in the 19th century. It was the property of the Lords of Romans, and from 1763 the property of the Earls of Romans-Ferrari. Now the castle hosts a medical-care home.

== See also ==
- Communes of the Ain department
