= Dombes =

Area in Ain, France

Coordinates: 45°58′N 05°00′E

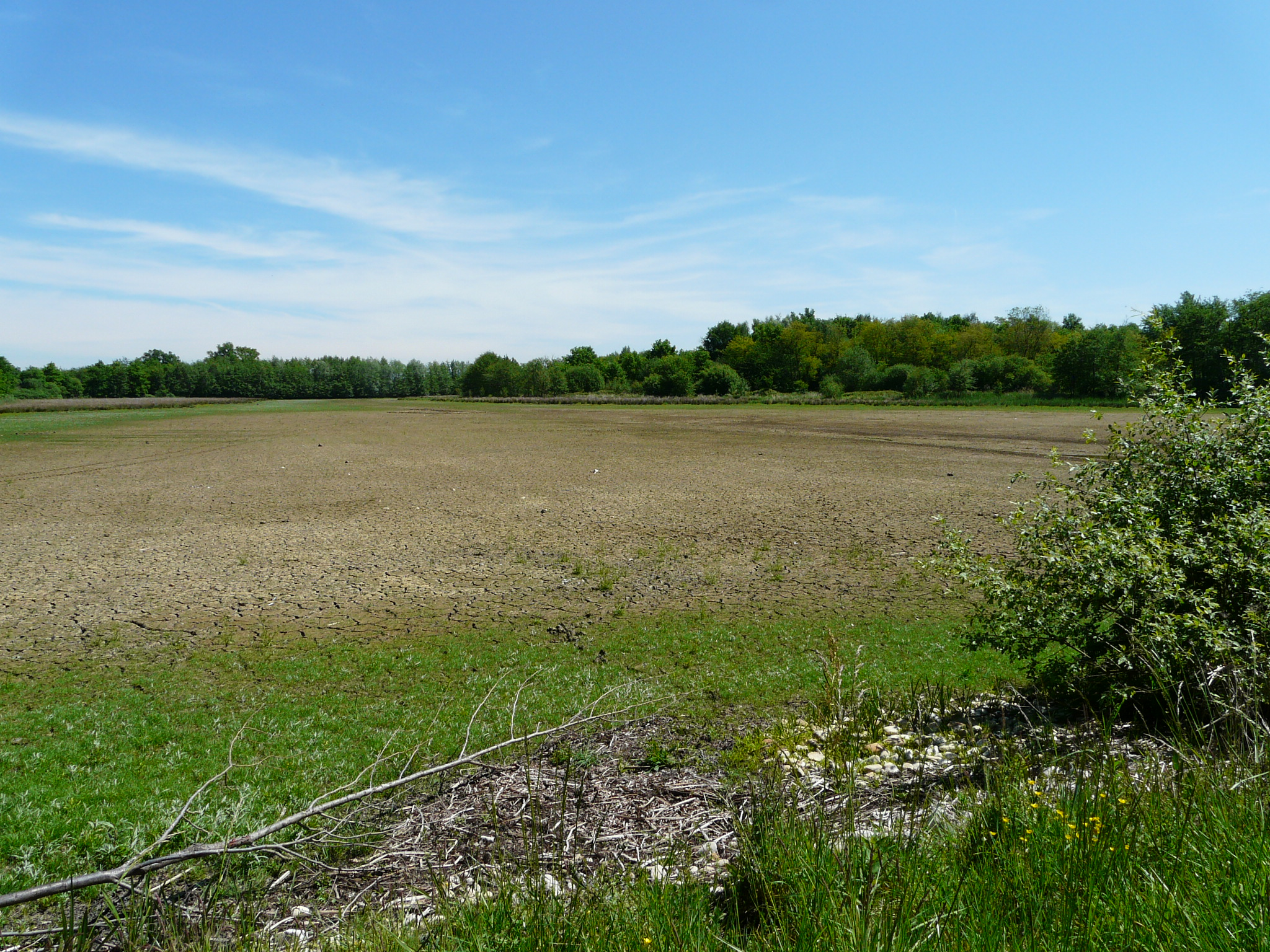
The Neuf pond, dried out, close to Bouligneux in Dombes (May, 2014).

The Dombes (French: [dɔ̃b]; Arpitan: Domba) is a natural region in eastern France comprised in the department of Ain, and bounded on the west by the Saône River, on the south by the Rhône, on the east by the Ain and on the north by the region of Bresse.

Formerly part of it was an independent sovereignty before becoming part of the province of Burgundy in 1781.

== Topography ==
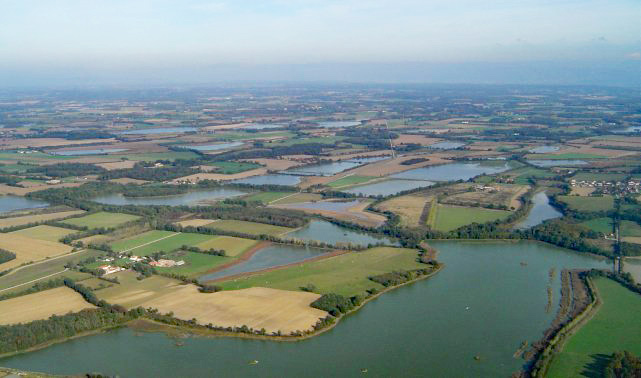
Aerial photo

The region forms an undulating plateau with a slight slope towards the north-west, the higher ground bordering the Ain and the Rhône attaining an average height of about 1,000 ft (300 m). The Dombes is characterized by an impervious surface consisting of boulder clay and other relics of glacial action. Because of this, there are a large number of rain-water pools, varying for the most part from 35 to 250 acres (1.0 km^{2}) in size which cover some 23,000 acres (93 km^{2}) of its total area of 282,000 acres (1,140 km^{2}). These pools, artificially created, date in many cases from the 15th century, some to earlier periods, and were formed by landed proprietors who in those disturbed times saw a surer source of revenue in fish-breeding than in agriculture.

Disease and depopulation resulted from this policy and at the end of the 18th century the Legislative Assembly decided to reduce the area of the pools which then covered twice their present extent. Drainage works were continued, roads cut, and other improvements effected during the 19th century; partly as a result of Napoleon III's installation of Trappist monks in the district to set about the task. Large numbers of fish, principally carp, pike, and tench are still reared profitably. The pools are periodically dried up so the ground can be cultivated.

== Political history ==
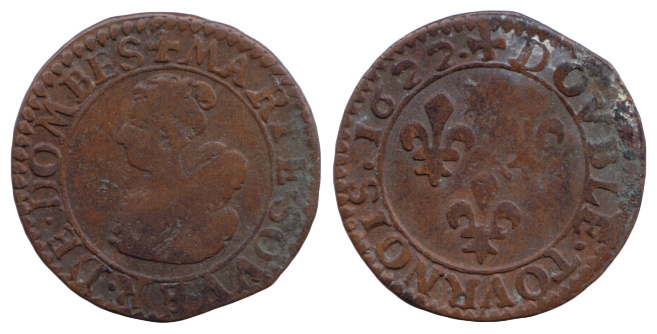
Double tournois coin, 1622, copper. Sovereign principality of the Dombes, Maria de Bourbon-Montpensier.

The Dombes (Latin Dumbae) once formed part of the Kingdom of Burgundy-Arles. In the 11th century, when the kingdom began to break up, the northern part of the Dombes came under the power of the lords of Bâgé, and in 1218, by the marriage of Marguerite de Baugé with Humbert V de Beaujeu, passed to the lords of Beaujeu. The southern portion was held in succession by the lords of Villars and of Thoire. Its lords took advantage of the excommunication of Frederick II, Holy Roman Emperor to assert their complete independence of the Holy Roman Empire.

In 1400, Louis II, Duke of Bourbon, acquired the northern part of the Dombes, together with the lordship of Beaujeu, and two years later bought the southern part from the sires de Thoire, forming the whole into a new sovereign principality of the Dombes, with Trévoux as its capital.

The principality was confiscated by King Francis I of France in 1523, along with the other possessions of the Constable de Bourbon, was granted in 1527 to the queen-mother, Louise of Savoy, and after her death was held successively by kings Francis I, Henry II and Francis II, and by Catherine de' Medici. In 1561 it was granted to Louis, duc de Montpensier, by whose descendants it was held till, in 1682, Anne Marie Louise of Orléans, the duchess of Montpensier, gave it to Louis XIV's bastard, the Duke of Maine, as part of the price for the release of her lover Lauzun.

The eldest son of the duke of Maine, Louis-Auguste de Bourbon (1700–1755), prince of Dombes, served in the army of Prince Eugene of Savoy against the Turks (1717), took part in the War of the Polish Succession (1733–1734), and in that of the Austrian Succession (1742–1747). He was made colonel-general of the Swiss regiment, governor of Languedoc and master of the hounds of France. He was succeeded, as prince of Dombes, by his brother the count of Eu, who in 1762 surrendered the principality to the crown. The little principality of Dombes showed in some respects signs of a vigorous life; the prince's mint and printing works at Trévoux were long famous, and the college at Thoissey was well endowed and influential.

== Summary ==
Taking the above information from 1911 with that from other sources, the district is composed of glacial till, from a period when the Alpine ice sheet extended over the area, probably from the Mindel and Riss glacials. This appears to be mainly clay deposited in situ as the ice melted. There appears to be also, sand and gravel on the clay in places. This may date from the latest glacial, the Würm.

The clay till (boulder clay), is usually very sticky when wet and hard when dry. This made arable use of the land with medieval implements impossible and it was unsuitable for pasture for most of the time. Usually, such land was left as woodland but here, landowners seem to have taken it on and attempted to make it produce income by excavating lakes for fish farming.

This was a sensible, commercial idea except in that the open, still and shallow water will have harboured the vectors of malaria. The population therefore remained small and probably sickly, until more effective, 19th century drainage permitted use of some of the land for pasture and modern agricultural methods permitted the heavier land to be used for ploughing. In parallel with these, medical advances overcame the malaria. Since the mid 20th century, the district has become fairly prosperous and the INSEE statistics now indicate a steady climb in population numbers.

== Communes ==
The borders of the Dombes are not sharply defined, especially towards the north, where it continues into the Bresse. The Dombes plateau proper does not include the escarpments (e.g. Côtière) and the plains along the Rivers Saône, Rhône and Ain. The communes in the wider Dombes region co-operate in several intercommunalities: Communauté de communes de la Dombes (36 communes, seat in Châtillon-sur-Chalaronne), Communauté de communes Dombes Saône Vallée (19 communes, seat in Trévoux), and part of the Communauté d'agglomération du Bassin de Bourg-en-Bresse (indicated "CAB" in the table below).

INSEE	Post#	Commune
01005	01330	Ambérieux-en-Dombes
01045	01330	Birieux
01052	01330	Bouligneux
01074	01320	Chalamont
01085	01240	La Chapelle-du-Châtelard
01090	01320	Châtenay
01092	01320	Châtillon-la-Palud
01093	01400	Châtillon-sur-Chalaronne
01113	01400	Condeissiat
01129	01320	Crans
01146	01400	Dompierre-sur-Chalaronne
01145	01240	Dompierre-sur-Veyle ^{(CAB)}
01198	01800	Joyeux
01207	01330	Lapeyrouse
01211	01240	Lent ^{(CAB)}
01260	01800	Le Montellier
01261	01390	Monthieux
01272	01400	Neuville-les-Dames
01299	01330	Le Plantay
01319	01990	Relevant
01328	01400	Romans
01335	01240	Saint-André-le-Bouchoux
01336	01960	Saint-André-sur-Vieux-Jonc ^{(CAB)}
01349	01800	Saint-Éloi
01382	01330	Sainte-Olive
01356	01400	Saint-Georges-sur-Renon
01371	01390	Saint-Marcel
01381	01320	Saint-Nizier-le-Désert
01383	01240	Saint-Paul-de-Varax
01393	01400	Sandrans
01405	01960	Servas ^{(CAB)}
01425	01160	La Tranclière ^{(CAB)}
01434	01330	Versailleux
01443	01330	Villars-les-Dombes
