= Jean-Baptiste Marchand =

French military officer and explorer (1863–1934)

General Jean-Baptiste Marchand
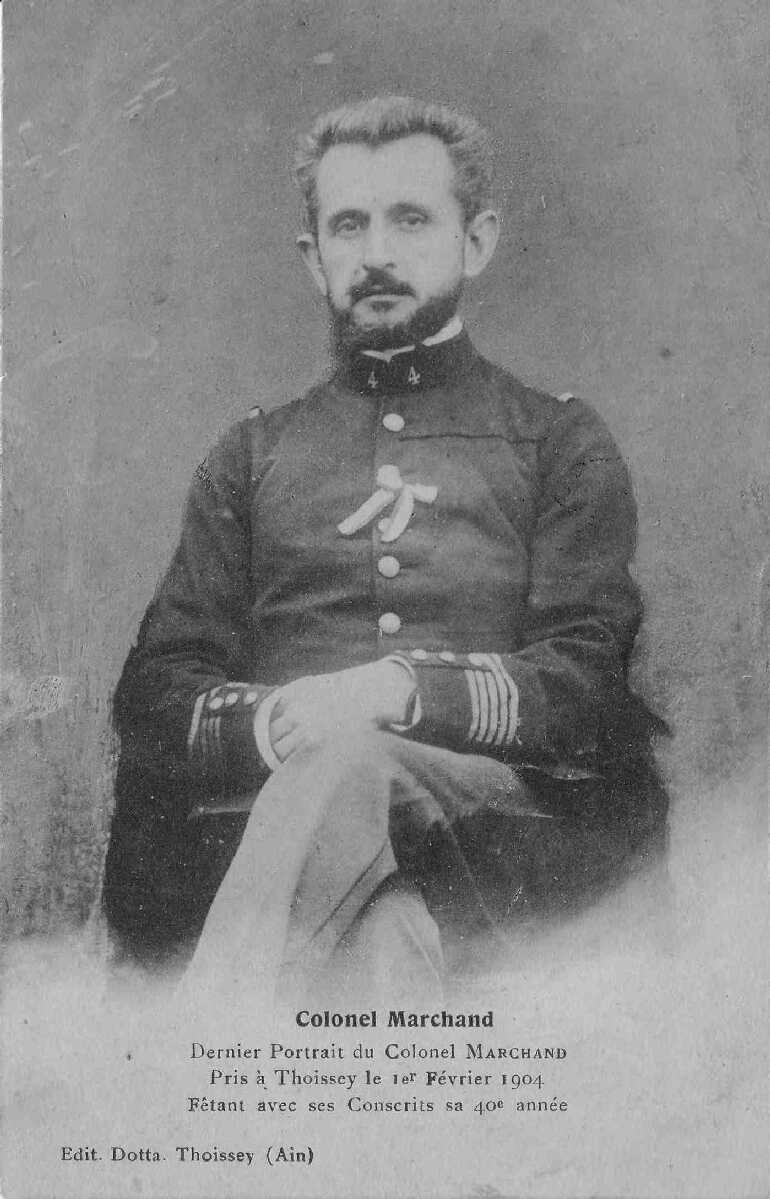
- Marchand in 1904
- Born: 22 November 1863; Thoissey, Ain, Second French Empire
- Died: 14 January 1934 (aged 70); Paris, French Third Republic
- Military career
- Allegiance: France
- Branch: French Army
- Service years: 1883–1919
- Rank: General
- Conflicts: French conquest of Senegal; Mahdist War; Fashoda Incident; Boxer Rebellion; World War I; Battle of Champagne; Battle of the Somme
- Awards: Grand Cross of the Legion of Honour (1921)

Jean-Baptiste Marchand (French pronunciation: [ʒɑ̃batist maʁʃɑ̃]; 22 November 1863 – 14 January 1934) was a French general and explorer in Africa. Marchand is best known for commanding the French expeditionary force during the 1898 Fashoda Incident.

== Career ==
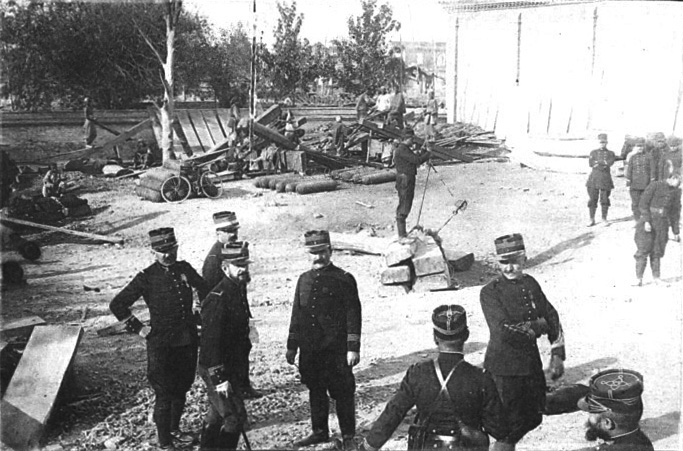
Jean Marchand (3rd from left) during the Boxer Rebellion.

Marchand was born in Thoissey, Ain, on 22 November 1863. In 1883 he enlisted as a volunteer soldat (private soldier) in the 4th Regiment of Infanterie de Marine based at Toulon. In April 1886 he attended l’Ecole militaire de Saint-Maixent - the French military academy for training officers promoted from the ranks. He was commissioned as a sous-lieutenant on 18 December 1887, at the age of 24. After serving in the 1st Regiment of Infanterie de Marine for six months, Marchand transferred to the tirailleurs sénégalais (West African colonial infantry with French officers).

He participated in the French conquest of Senegal and was severely wounded in 1889 at the capture of Diena by the French. In 1890 lieutenant Marchand was taking part in the conquest of French Sudan. In 1896 he was sent to occupy the area around Fashoda, Sudan, now known as Kodok, and bring it under French control. After a 24-month trek on foot and by boat from Loango at the mouth of the Congo River Marchand's expedition of 20 French officers and NCOs and 130 French Senegalese troops arrived at Fashoda, an abandoned fort on the Nile, on 10 July 1898. Marchand rebuilt the fort, but the expected support from other French columns and from Abyssinia did not arrive.

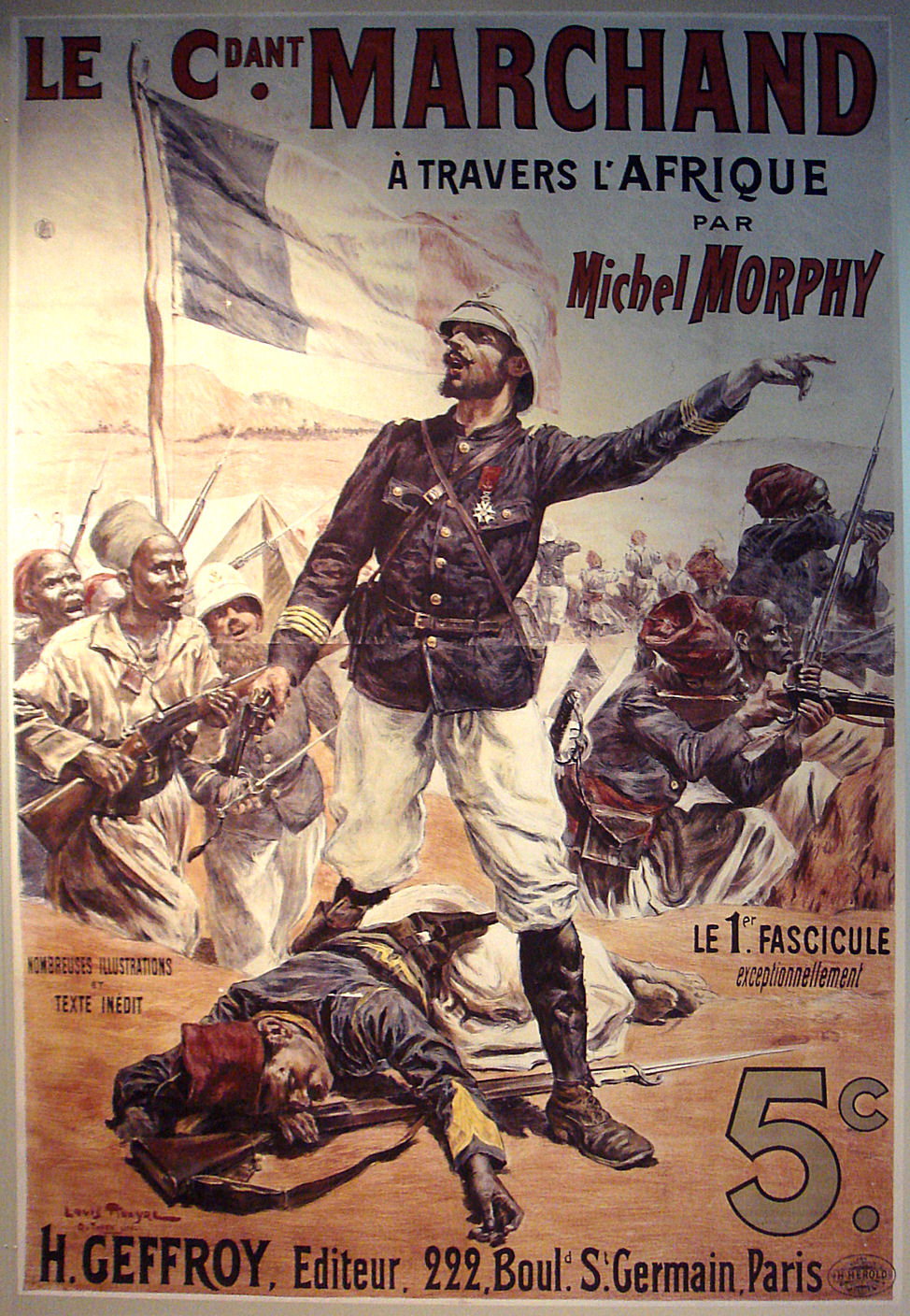
Contemporary illustration of Major Marchand's trek across Africa.

On 18 September, a detachment led by Sir Herbert Kitchener, commander of the Anglo-Egyptian army that had just defeated the forces of the Mahdi at the Battle of Omdurman, arrived at Fashoda. Following the battle Kitchener had opened sealed orders from London to investigate the French expedition some 600 kilometres to the south. Both sides insisted on control of Fashoda but the two commanders were diplomatic and the encounter was polite. It led to a period of intense diplomatic discussions between Paris and London, at the end of which the French Government ordered their forces to leave. Marchand had already been recalled to France and insisted on travelling through Abyssinia rather than down the British-controlled Nile. He arrived in Djibouti on 16 May 1899, having spent almost four years on his mission. This mission is commemorated by a monument in Paris in the Bois de Vincennes.

Marchand later fought with French expeditionary forces in China during the 1900 Boxer Rebellion. He was promoted to the rank of General in 1915 during World War I and was wounded in 1915 in the Battle of Champagne and again in 1916 in the Battle of the Somme. He retired from the Army in 1919.

In 1920, he was awarded the Grand Cross of the Legion of Honour. According to the British journalist Aubrey Kennedy (1885–1965) Marchand was reportedly unhappy with the change of name from Fashoda to Kodok, remarking to Tracy Philipps in the aftermath of a League of Nations meeting that he regretted the 'disappearance' of Fashoda, believing it to be a historic episode that should not be forgotten.

He died at his home in Paris on 14 January 1934, after suffering from rheumatism and effects of the wounds he received in World War I.
