= Condeissiat =

Commune in Auvergne-Rhône-Alpes, France

- Commune
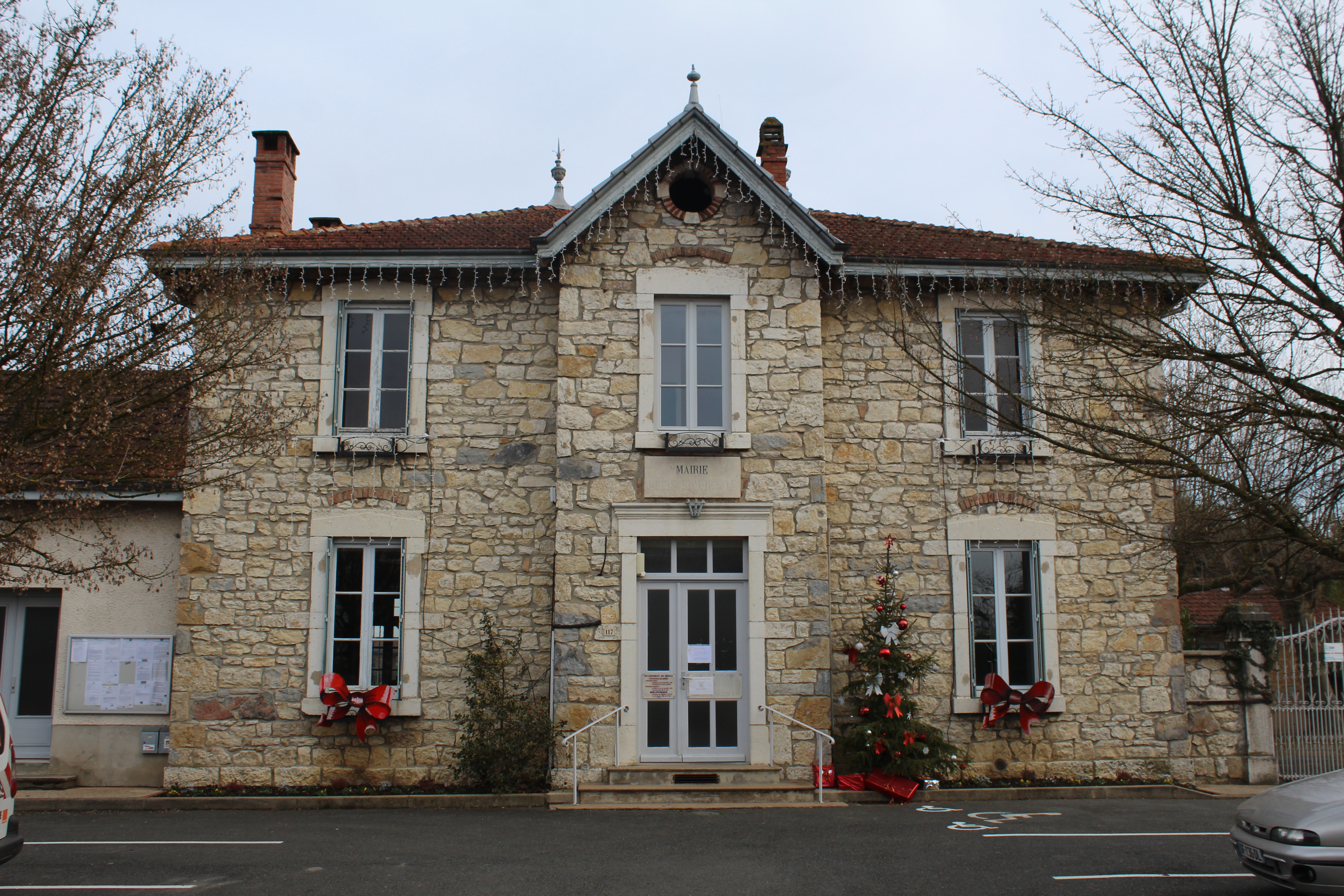
- Town hall
- Location of Condeissiat
- Location within France Location within Auvergne-Rhône-Alpes
- Coordinates: 46°10′00″N 5°05′00″E
- Country: France
- Region: Auvergne-Rhône-Alpes
- Department: Ain
- Arrondissement: Bourg-en-Bresse
- Canton: Châtillon-sur-Chalaronne

Government
  - Mayor (2026–32): Stephen Gautier
- Area^{1}: 21.64 km^{2} (8.36 sq mi)
- Elevation: 240 m (790 ft)
- Highest elevation: 268 m (879 ft)
- Lowest elevation: 232 m (761 ft)
- Population (2023): 839
  - Density: 38.8/km^{2} (100/sq mi)
- Time zone: UTC+01:00 (CET)
  - Summer (DST): UTC+02:00 (CEST)
- INSEE/Postal code: 01113 /01400
- ^{1} French Land Register data, which excludes lakes, ponds, glaciers > 1 km^{2} (0.386 sq mi or 247 acres) and river estuaries.

Condeissiat (French pronunciation: [kɔ̃dɛsja]; Arpitan: Condèssiê) is a commune in the Ain department in eastern France.

== Population ==
Historical population
| Year | Pop. | ±% p.a. |
|---|---|---|
| 1968 | 519 | — |
| 1975 | 510 | −0.25% |
| 1982 | 496 | −0.40% |
| 1990 | 581 | +2.00% |
| 1999 | 649 | +1.24% |
| 2007 | 741 | +1.67% |
| 2012 | 785 | +1.16% |
| 2017 | 822 | +0.93% |
| 2023 | 839 | +0.34% |
Source: INSEE

== See also ==
- Communes of the Ain department
- Dombes
