= Neuville-les-Dames =

Commune in Auvergne-Rhône-Alpes, France

- Commune
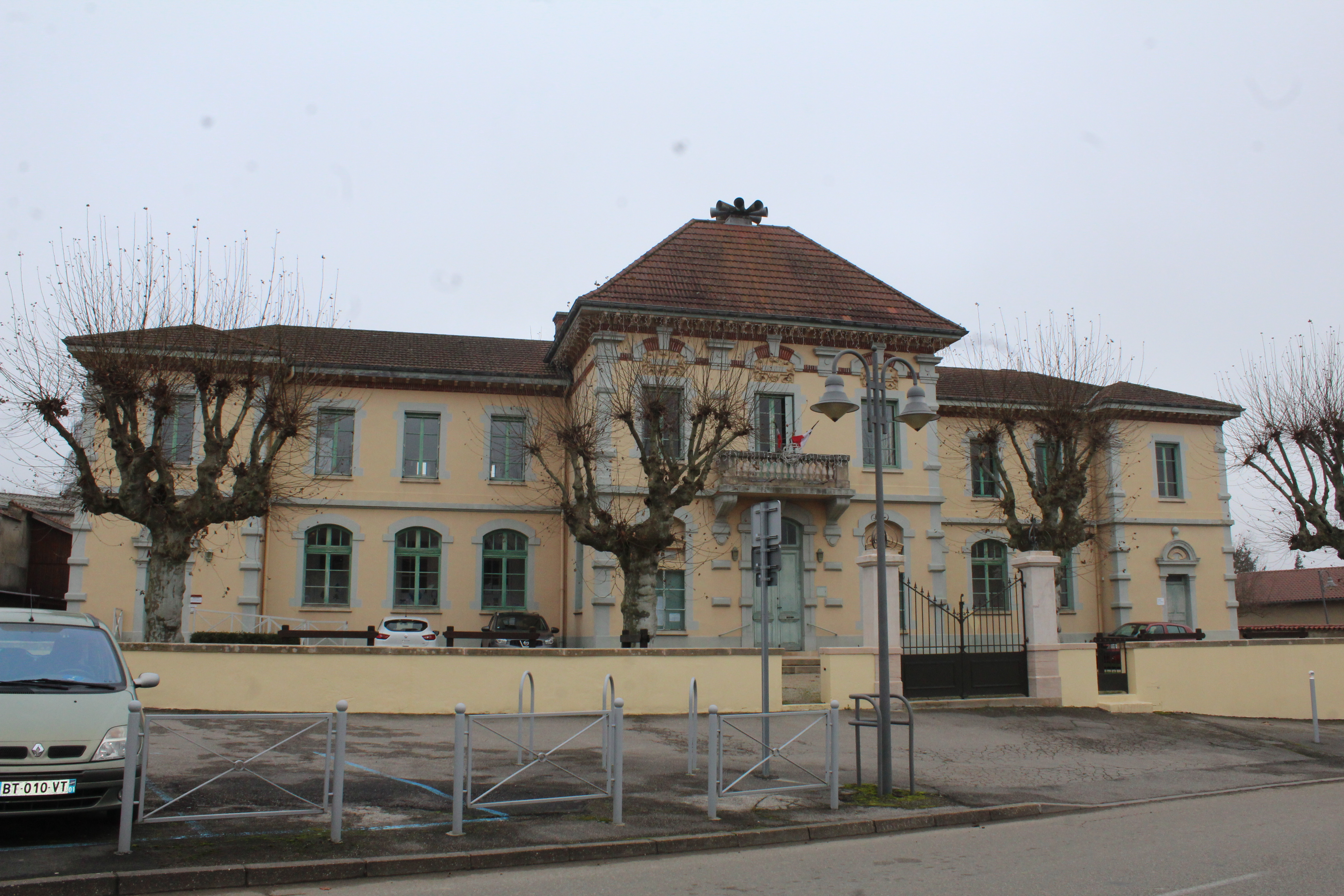
- Town hall

- Coat of arms
- Location of Neuville-les-Dames
- Location within France Location within Auvergne-Rhône-Alpes
- Coordinates: 46°09′43″N 5°00′11″E
- Country: France
- Region: Auvergne-Rhône-Alpes
- Department: Ain
- Arrondissement: Bourg-en-Bresse
- Canton: Châtillon-sur-Chalaronne

Government
  - Mayor (2026–32): Aurélien Josserand
- Area^{1}: 26.59 km^{2} (10.27 sq mi)
- Elevation: 228 m (748 ft)
- Highest elevation: 271 m (889 ft)
- Lowest elevation: 210 m (690 ft)
- Population (2023): 1,565
  - Density: 58.86/km^{2} (152.4/sq mi)
- Time zone: UTC+01:00 (CET)
  - Summer (DST): UTC+02:00 (CEST)
- INSEE/Postal code: 01272 /01400
- ^{1} French Land Register data, which excludes lakes, ponds, glaciers > 1 km^{2} (0.386 sq mi or 247 acres) and river estuaries.

Neuville-les-Dames (French pronunciation: [nøvil le dam]) is a commune in the Ain department in eastern France.

== Population ==
Historical population
Year	Pop.	±% p.a.
1968	1,062	—
1975	1,069	+0.09%
1982	1,064	−0.07%
1990	1,141	+0.88%
1999	1,231	+0.85%
2007	1,538	+2.82%
2012	1,490	−0.63%
2017	1,510	+0.27%
2023	1,565	+0.60%
Source: INSEE

== See also ==
- Communes of the Ain department
- Dombes
