= Canton of Châtillon-sur-Chalaronne =

Coordinates: 46°07′18″N 4°57′21″E

Châtillon-sur-Chalaronne
- Canton
- Interactive map of Châtillon-sur-Chalaronne
- Country: France
- Region: Auvergne-Rhône-Alpes
- Department: Ain
- No. of communes: {{{nbcomm}}}

Government
  - Representatives (2021–2028): Patricia Chmara and Patrick Mathias
- Area: 356.67 km^{2} (137.71 sq mi)
- Population (2023): 31,343
  - Density: 87.877/km^{2} (227.60/sq mi)
- INSEE code: 01 08

The canton of Châtillon-sur-Chalaronne is an administrative division in eastern France. At the French canton reorganisation which came into effect in March 2015, the canton was expanded from 16 to 26 communes:

1. L'Abergement-Clémenciat
2. La Chapelle-du-Châtelard
3. Châtillon-sur-Chalaronne
4. Condeissiat
5. Dompierre-sur-Chalaronne
6. Garnerans
7. Genouilleux
8. Guéreins
9. Illiat
10. Marlieux
11. Mogneneins
12. Montceaux
13. Montmerle-sur-Saône
14. Neuville-les-Dames
15. Peyzieux-sur-Saône
16. Romans
17. Saint-André-le-Bouchoux
18. Saint-Didier-sur-Chalaronne
19. Saint-Étienne-sur-Chalaronne
20. Saint-Georges-sur-Renon
21. Saint-Germain-sur-Renon
22. Saint-Paul-de-Varax
23. Sandrans
24. Sulignat
25. Thoissey
26. Valeins

== Demographics ==
Historical population
Year	Pop.	±% p.a.
2013	29,483	—
2018	30,182	+0.47%
Source: INSEE

== See also ==
- Cantons of the Ain department
- Communes of France
