= Saint-Georges-sur-Renon =

Commune in Auvergne-Rhône-Alpes, France

- Commune
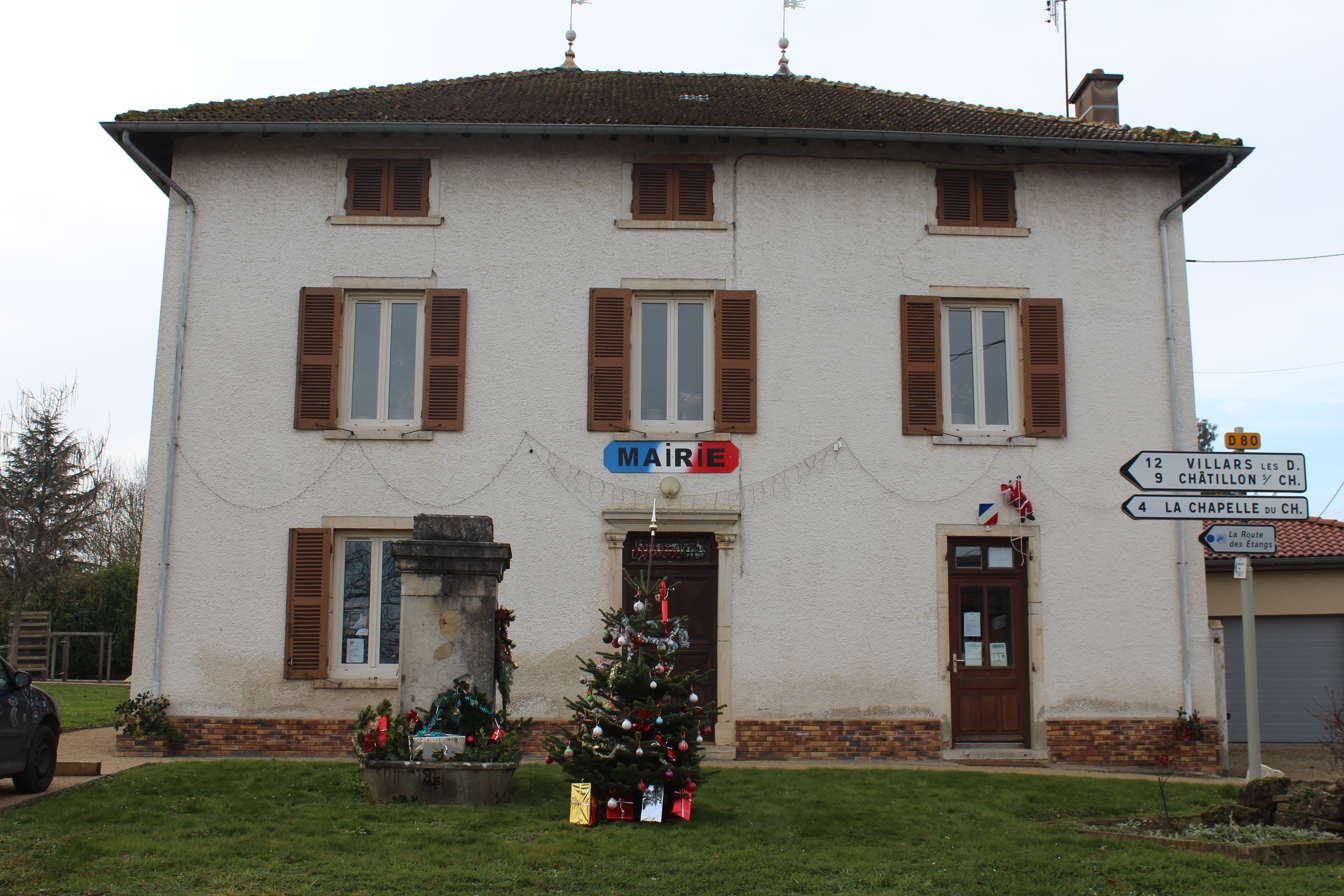
- Town hall

- Coat of arms
- Location of Saint-Georges-sur-Renon
- Location within France Location within Auvergne-Rhône-Alpes
- Coordinates: 46°06′00″N 5°02′00″E
- Country: France
- Region: Auvergne-Rhône-Alpes
- Department: Ain
- Arrondissement: Bourg-en-Bresse
- Canton: Châtillon-sur-Chalaronne
- Intercommunality: CC de la Dombes

Government
  - Mayor (2026–32): Sonia Peri
- Area^{1}: 5.7 km^{2} (2.2 sq mi)
- Elevation: 259 m (850 ft)
- Highest elevation: 291 m (955 ft)
- Lowest elevation: 240 m (790 ft)
- Population (2023): 228
  - Density: 40/km^{2} (100/sq mi)
- Time zone: UTC+01:00 (CET)
  - Summer (DST): UTC+02:00 (CEST)
- INSEE/Postal code: 01356 /01400
- ^{1} French Land Register data, which excludes lakes, ponds, glaciers > 1 km^{2} (0.386 sq mi or 247 acres) and river estuaries.

Saint-Georges-sur-Renon (French pronunciation: [sɛ̃ ʒɔʁʒ syʁ ʁənɔ̃]; Arpitan: Sent-Jôrjo) is a commune in the Ain department in eastern France.

== Population ==
Historical population
Year	Pop.	±% p.a.
1968	108	—
1975	95	−1.82%
1982	105	+1.44%
1990	126	+2.31%
1999	161	+2.76%
2007	192	+2.23%
2012	208	+1.61%
2017	214	+0.57%
2023	228	+1.06%
Source: INSEE

== See also ==
- Communes of the Ain department
- Dombes
