= Saint-André-le-Bouchoux =

Commune in Auvergne-Rhône-Alpes, France

- Commune
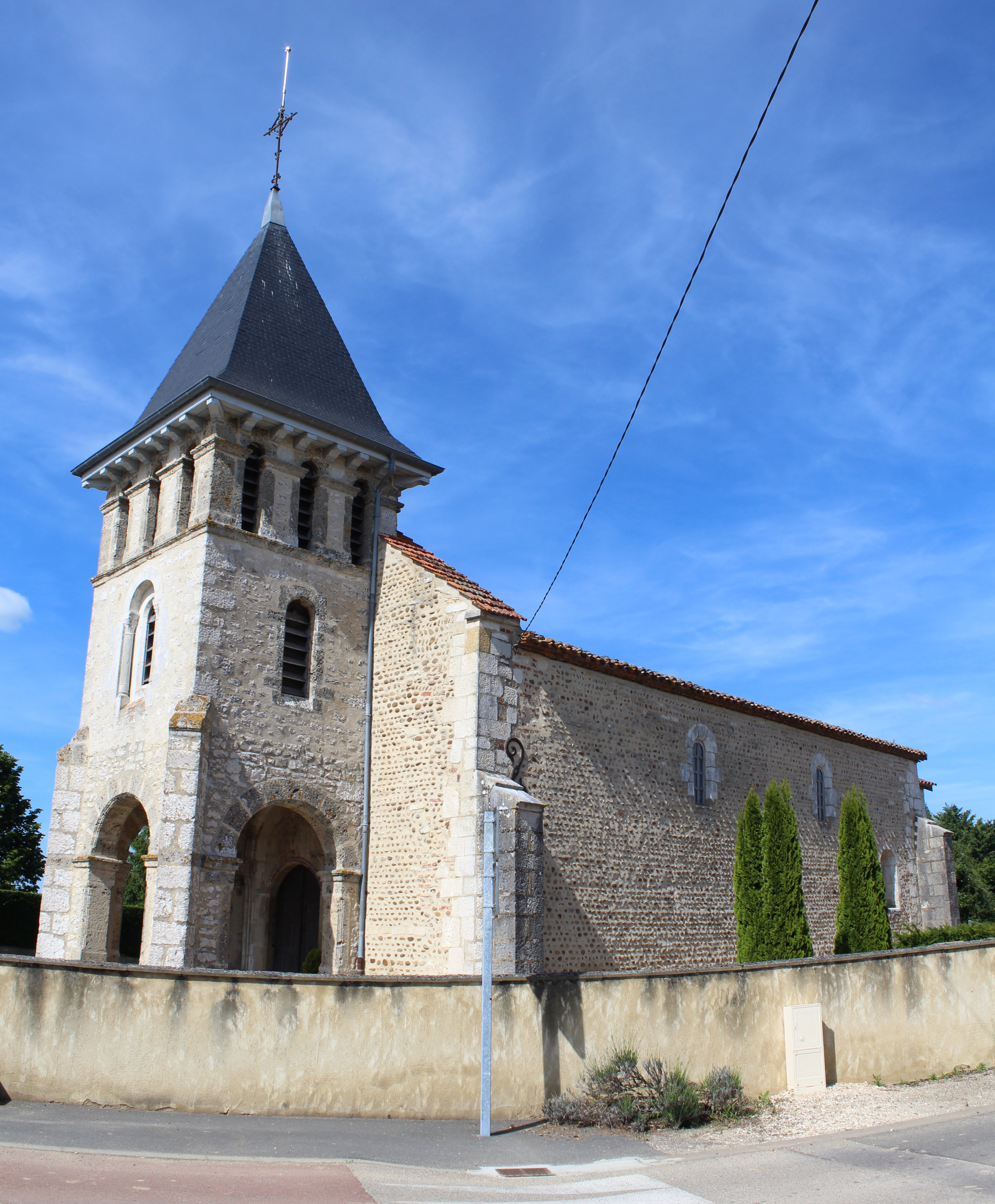
- Location of Saint-André-le-Bouchoux
- Location within France Location within Auvergne-Rhône-Alpes
- Coordinates: 46°07′00″N 5°05′00″E
- Country: France
- Region: Auvergne-Rhône-Alpes
- Department: Ain
- Arrondissement: Bourg-en-Bresse
- Canton: Châtillon-sur-Chalaronne

Government
  - Mayor (2026–32): Frédéric Haupert
- Area^{1}: 9.5 km^{2} (3.7 sq mi)
- Elevation: 268 m (879 ft)
- Highest elevation: 274 m (899 ft)
- Lowest elevation: 259 m (850 ft)
- Population (2023): 409
  - Density: 43/km^{2} (110/sq mi)
- Time zone: UTC+01:00 (CET)
  - Summer (DST): UTC+02:00 (CEST)
- INSEE/Postal code: 01335 /01240
- ^{1} French Land Register data, which excludes lakes, ponds, glaciers > 1 km^{2} (0.386 sq mi or 247 acres) and river estuaries.

Saint-André-le-Bouchoux (French pronunciation: [sɛ̃.t‿ɑ̃dʁe lə buʃu]; Arpitan: Sent-André Lo Bouchox [lɔ bu.ˈθo]) is a commune in the Ain department in eastern France.

The river Irance flows through the town.

In 1836, the community was considered one of the poorest in France. It has gained wealth since, though. Today, most of the town revolves around restaurants, farms, and crafts.

== Population ==
Historical population
Year	Pop.	±% p.a.
1968	142	—
1975	127	−1.58%
1982	156	+2.98%
1990	171	+1.15%
1999	191	+1.24%
2007	303	+5.94%
2012	340	+2.33%
2017	390	+2.78%
2023	409	+0.80%
Source: INSEE

== Sights ==
The church was designed in the Roman style in the 11th century and redesigned in the 15th.

== See also ==
- Communes of the Ain department
- Dombes
