= Mogneneins =

Commune in Auvergne-Rhône-Alpes, France

- Commune
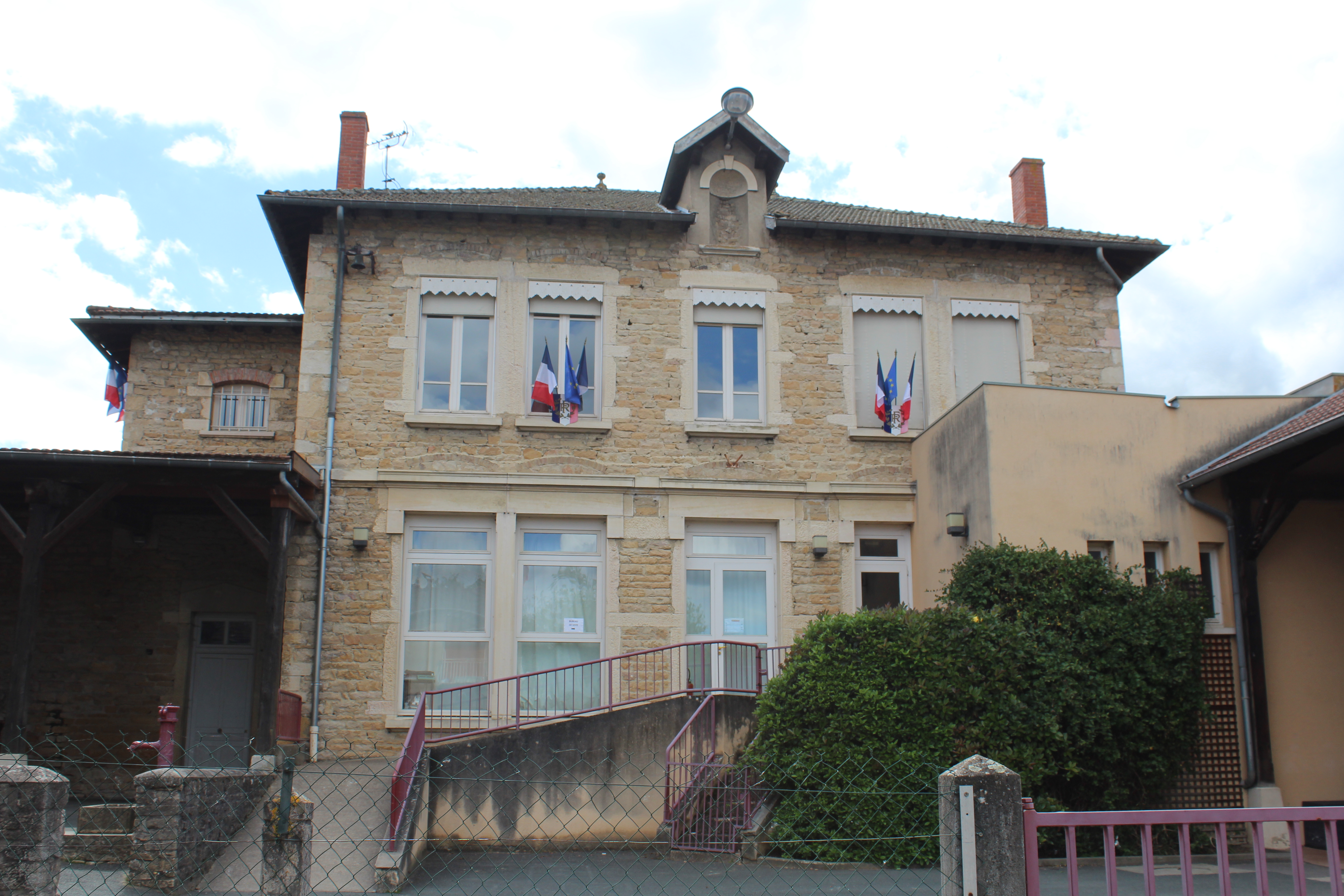
- Town hall

- Coat of arms
- Location of Mogneneins
- Location within France Location within Auvergne-Rhône-Alpes
- Coordinates: 46°08′00″N 4°49′00″E
- Country: France
- Region: Auvergne-Rhône-Alpes
- Department: Ain
- Arrondissement: Bourg-en-Bresse
- Canton: Châtillon-sur-Chalaronne

Government
  - Mayor (2026–32): Jean-Pierre Champion
- Area^{1}: 8.57 km^{2} (3.31 sq mi)
- Elevation: 224 m (735 ft)
- Highest elevation: 238 m (781 ft)
- Lowest elevation: 168 m (551 ft)
- Population (2023): 841
  - Density: 98.1/km^{2} (254/sq mi)
- Time zone: UTC+01:00 (CET)
  - Summer (DST): UTC+02:00 (CEST)
- INSEE/Postal code: 01252 /01140
- ^{1} French Land Register data, which excludes lakes, ponds, glaciers > 1 km^{2} (0.386 sq mi or 247 acres) and river estuaries.

Mogneneins (French pronunciation: [mɔɲnɛ̃]; Arpitan: Mognenens) is a commune in the Ain department in eastern France.

== Population ==
Historical population
Year	Pop.	±% p.a.
1968	409	—
1975	373	−1.31%
1982	442	+2.45%
1990	491	+1.32%
1999	572	+1.71%
2007	671	+2.02%
2012	751	+2.28%
2017	778	+0.71%
2023	841	+1.31%
Source: INSEE

== Sport ==
The 2024 Tour de l'Ain passed through Mogneneins on 13 July.

== See also ==
- Communes of the Ain department
