= Peyzieux-sur-Saône =

Commune in Auvergne-Rhône-Alpes, France

Peyzieux-sur-Saône Pèsiô (Arpitan)
- Commune
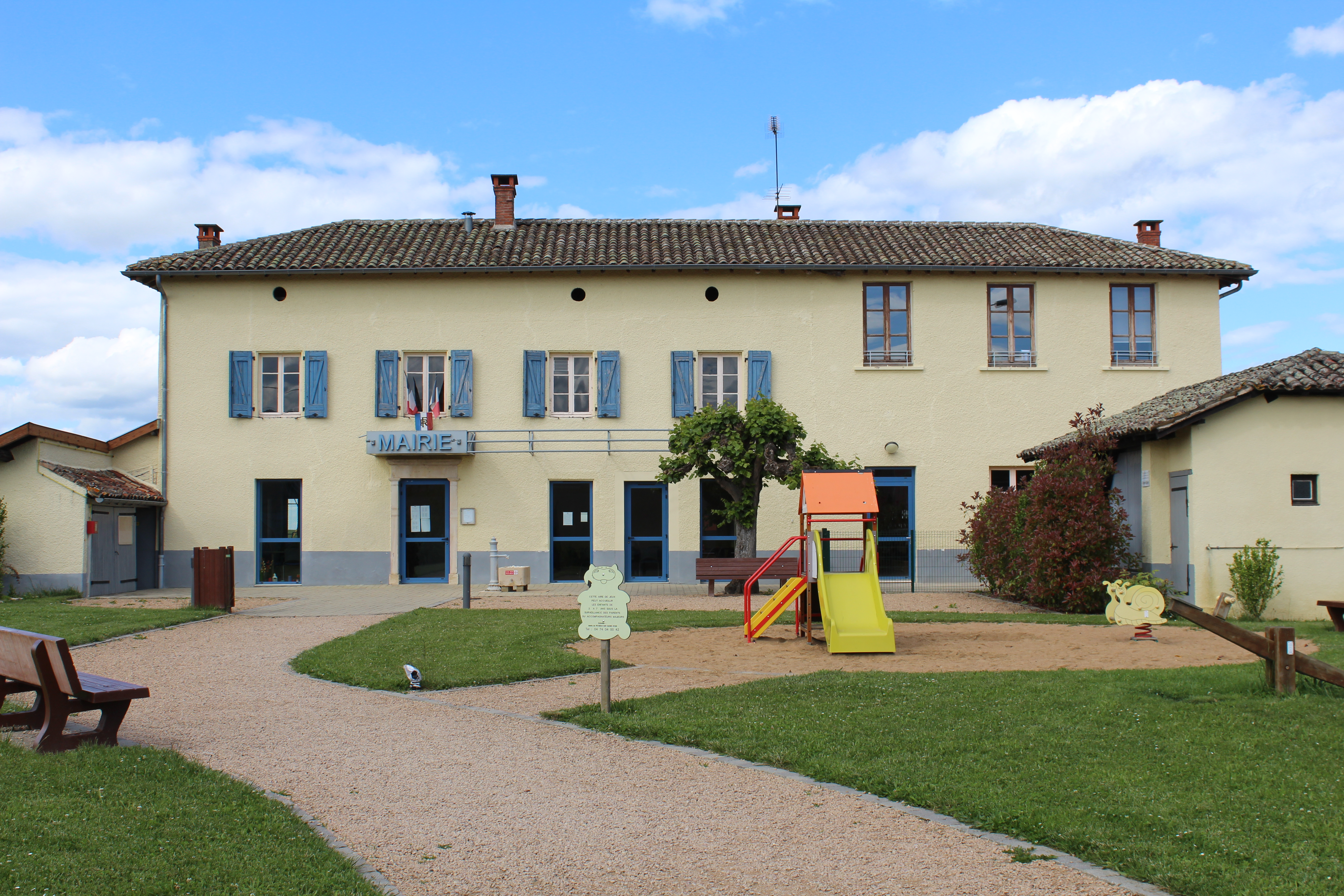
- Town hall

- Coat of arms
- Location of Peyzieux-sur-Saône
- Location within France Location within Auvergne-Rhône-Alpes
- Coordinates: 46°07′00″N 4°49′00″E
- Country: France
- Region: Auvergne-Rhône-Alpes
- Department: Ain
- Arrondissement: Bourg-en-Bresse
- Canton: Châtillon-sur-Chalaronne

Government
  - Mayor (2026–32): Romain Cottey
- Area^{1}: 8.66 km^{2} (3.34 sq mi)
- Elevation: 228 m (748 ft)
- Highest elevation: 259 m (850 ft)
- Lowest elevation: 169 m (554 ft)
- Population (2023): 654
  - Density: 75.5/km^{2} (196/sq mi)
- Time zone: UTC+01:00 (CET)
  - Summer (DST): UTC+02:00 (CEST)
- INSEE/Postal code: 01295 /01140
- ^{1} French Land Register data, which excludes lakes, ponds, glaciers > 1 km^{2} (0.386 sq mi or 247 acres) and river estuaries.

Peyzieux-sur-Saône (French pronunciation: [pezjø syʁ son]; Arpitan: Pèsiô [pe.ˈʒy]) is a commune in the Ain department in eastern France.

== Population ==
Historical population
Year	Pop.	±% p.a.
1968	223	—
1975	204	−1.26%
1982	219	+1.02%
1990	245	+1.41%
1999	337	+3.61%
2007	353	+0.58%
2012	576	+10.29%
2017	661	+2.79%
2023	654	−0.18%
Source: INSEE

== See also ==
- Communes of the Ain department
