= Valeins =

Commune in Auvergne-Rhône-Alpes, France

- Commune
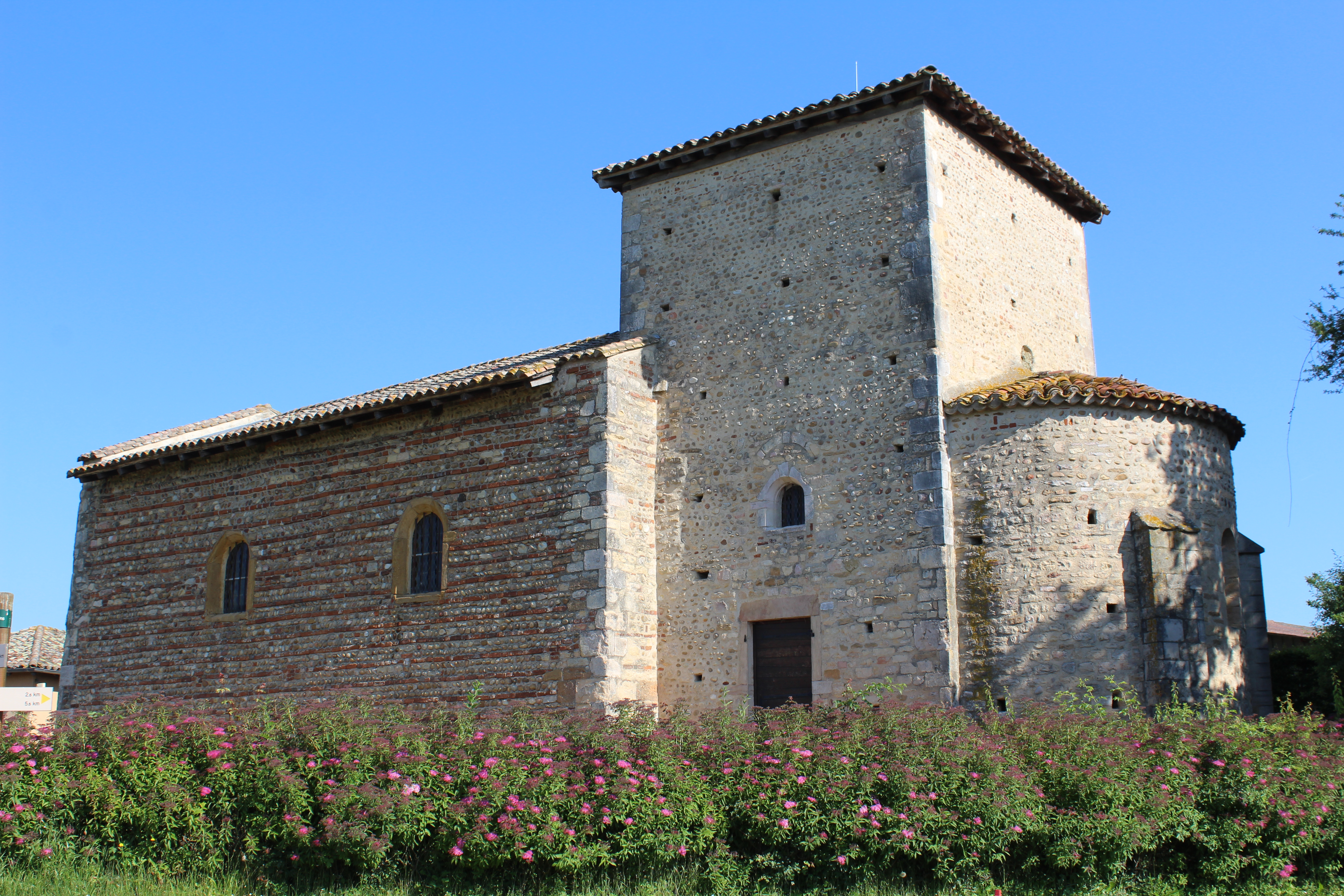
- Location of Valeins
- Location within France Location within Auvergne-Rhône-Alpes
- Coordinates: 46°06′47″N 4°52′20″E
- Country: France
- Region: Auvergne-Rhône-Alpes
- Department: Ain
- Arrondissement: Bourg-en-Bresse
- Canton: Châtillon-sur-Chalaronne

Government
  - Mayor (2026–32): Frédéric Bardon
- Area^{1}: 4.36 km^{2} (1.68 sq mi)
- Elevation: 210 m (690 ft)
- Highest elevation: 267 m (876 ft)
- Lowest elevation: 229 m (751 ft)
- Population (2023): 128
  - Density: 29.4/km^{2} (76.0/sq mi)
- Time zone: UTC+01:00 (CET)
  - Summer (DST): UTC+02:00 (CEST)
- INSEE/Postal code: 01428 /01140
- ^{1} French Land Register data, which excludes lakes, ponds, glaciers > 1 km^{2} (0.386 sq mi or 247 acres) and river estuaries.

Valeins (French pronunciation: [valɛ̃]; Arpitan: Valens) is a commune in the Ain department in eastern France.

== Population ==
Historical population
| Year | Pop. | ±% p.a. |
|---|---|---|
| 1968 | 78 | — |
| 1975 | 74 | −0.75% |
| 1982 | 67 | −1.41% |
| 1990 | 61 | −1.17% |
| 1999 | 67 | +1.05% |
| 2007 | 91 | +3.90% |
| 2012 | 104 | +2.71% |
| 2017 | 130 | +4.56% |
| 2023 | 128 | −0.26% |
Source: INSEE

== See also ==
- Communes of the Ain department
