= Sandrans =

Commune in Auvergne-Rhône-Alpes, France

- Commune
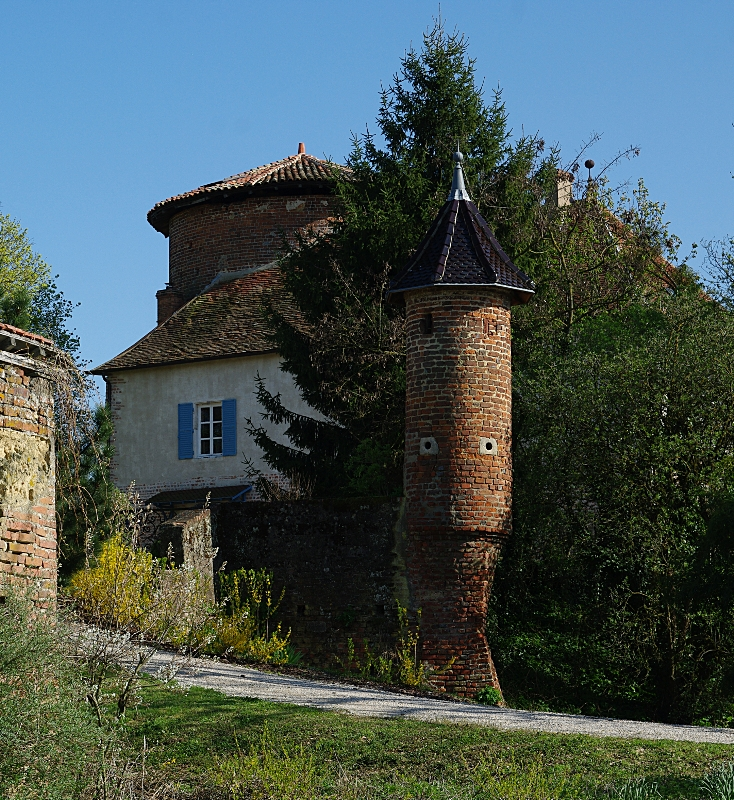
- Chateau

- Coat of arms
- Location of Sandrans
- Location within France Location within Auvergne-Rhône-Alpes
- Coordinates: 46°04′00″N 4°59′00″E
- Country: France
- Region: Auvergne-Rhône-Alpes
- Department: Ain
- Arrondissement: Bourg-en-Bresse
- Canton: Châtillon-sur-Chalaronne
- Intercommunality: Dombes

Government
  - Mayor (2026–32): Patrick Alvarez
- Area^{1}: 29.03 km^{2} (11.21 sq mi)
- Elevation: 280 m (920 ft)
- Highest elevation: 291 m (955 ft)
- Lowest elevation: 235 m (771 ft)
- Population (2023): 582
  - Density: 20.0/km^{2} (51.9/sq mi)
- Time zone: UTC+01:00 (CET)
  - Summer (DST): UTC+02:00 (CEST)
- INSEE/Postal code: 01393 /01100
- ^{1} French Land Register data, which excludes lakes, ponds, glaciers > 1 km^{2} (0.386 sq mi or 247 acres) and river estuaries.

Sandrans (French pronunciation: [sɑ̃dʁɑ̃]; Arpitan: Sandrens) is a commune in the Ain department in eastern France.

== Geography ==
The Chalaronne forms parts of the commune's northeastern border.

== Population ==
Historical population
Year	Pop.	±% p.a.
1968	361	—
1975	366	+0.20%
1982	379	+0.50%
1990	346	−1.13%
1999	416	+2.07%
2007	516	+2.73%
2012	514	−0.08%
2017	530	+0.61%
2023	582	+1.57%
Source: INSEE

== See also ==
- Communes of the Ain department
