= Sulignat =

Commune in Auvergne-Rhône-Alpes, France

- Commune
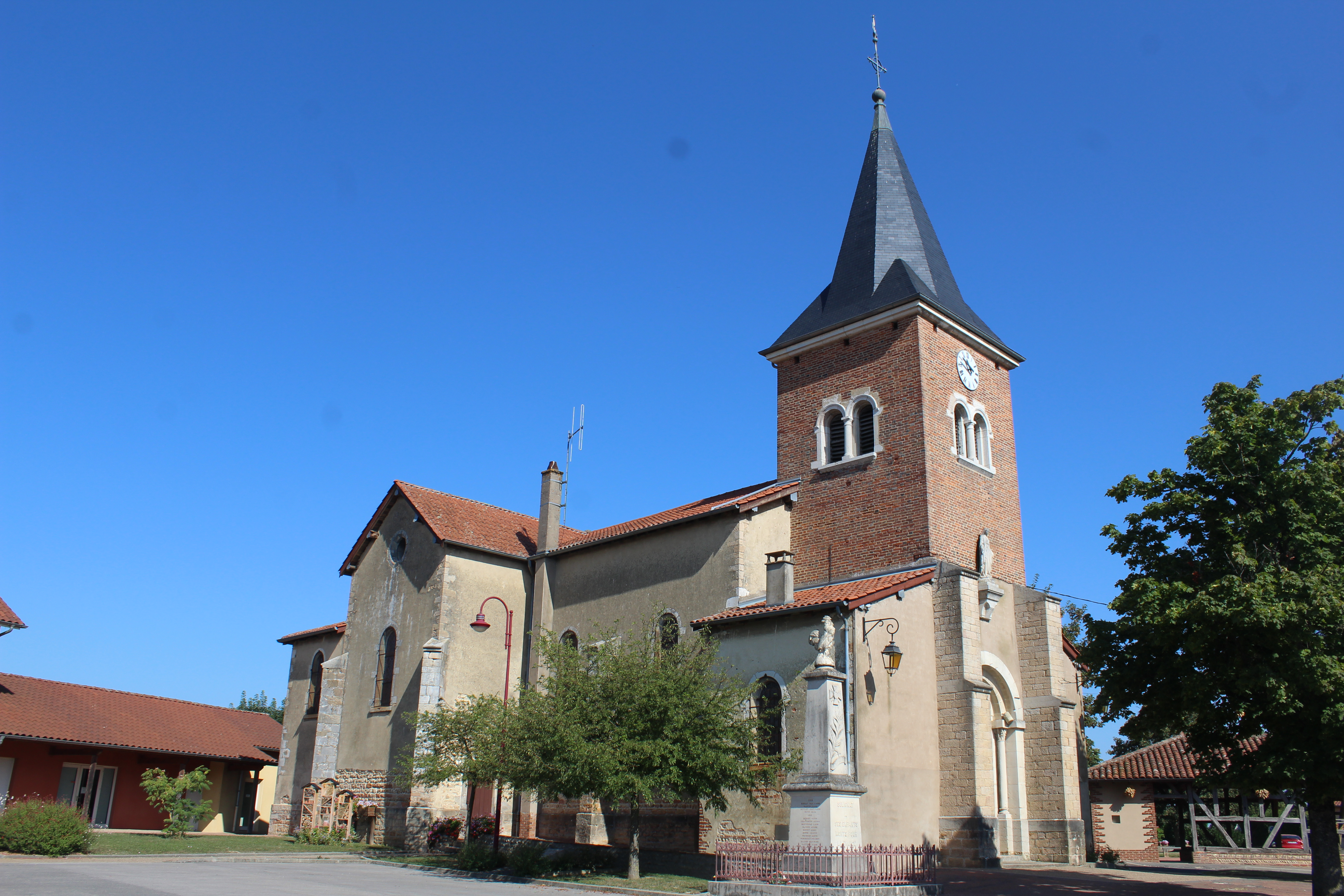
- Location of Sulignat
- Location within France Location within Auvergne-Rhône-Alpes
- Coordinates: 46°10′00″N 4°58′00″E
- Country: France
- Region: Auvergne-Rhône-Alpes
- Department: Ain
- Arrondissement: Bourg-en-Bresse
- Canton: Châtillon-sur-Chalaronne

Government
  - Mayor (2026–32): Alain Genestoux
- Area^{1}: 10.9 km^{2} (4.2 sq mi)
- Elevation: 260 m (850 ft)
- Highest elevation: 278 m (912 ft)
- Lowest elevation: 202 m (663 ft)
- Population (2023): 602
  - Density: 55.2/km^{2} (143/sq mi)
- Time zone: UTC+01:00 (CET)
  - Summer (DST): UTC+02:00 (CEST)
- INSEE/Postal code: 01412 /01400
- ^{1} French Land Register data, which excludes lakes, ponds, glaciers > 1 km^{2} (0.386 sq mi or 247 acres) and river estuaries.

Sulignat (French pronunciation: [syliɲa]) is a commune in the Ain department in eastern France.

== Population ==
Historical population
Year	Pop.	±% p.a.
1968	367	—
1975	348	−0.76%
1982	370	+0.88%
1990	434	+2.01%
1999	485	+1.24%
2007	569	+2.02%
2012	556	−0.46%
2017	586	+1.06%
2023	602	+0.45%
Source: INSEE

== See also ==
- Communes of the Ain department
