= Genouilleux =

Commune in Auvergne-Rhône-Alpes, France

- Commune
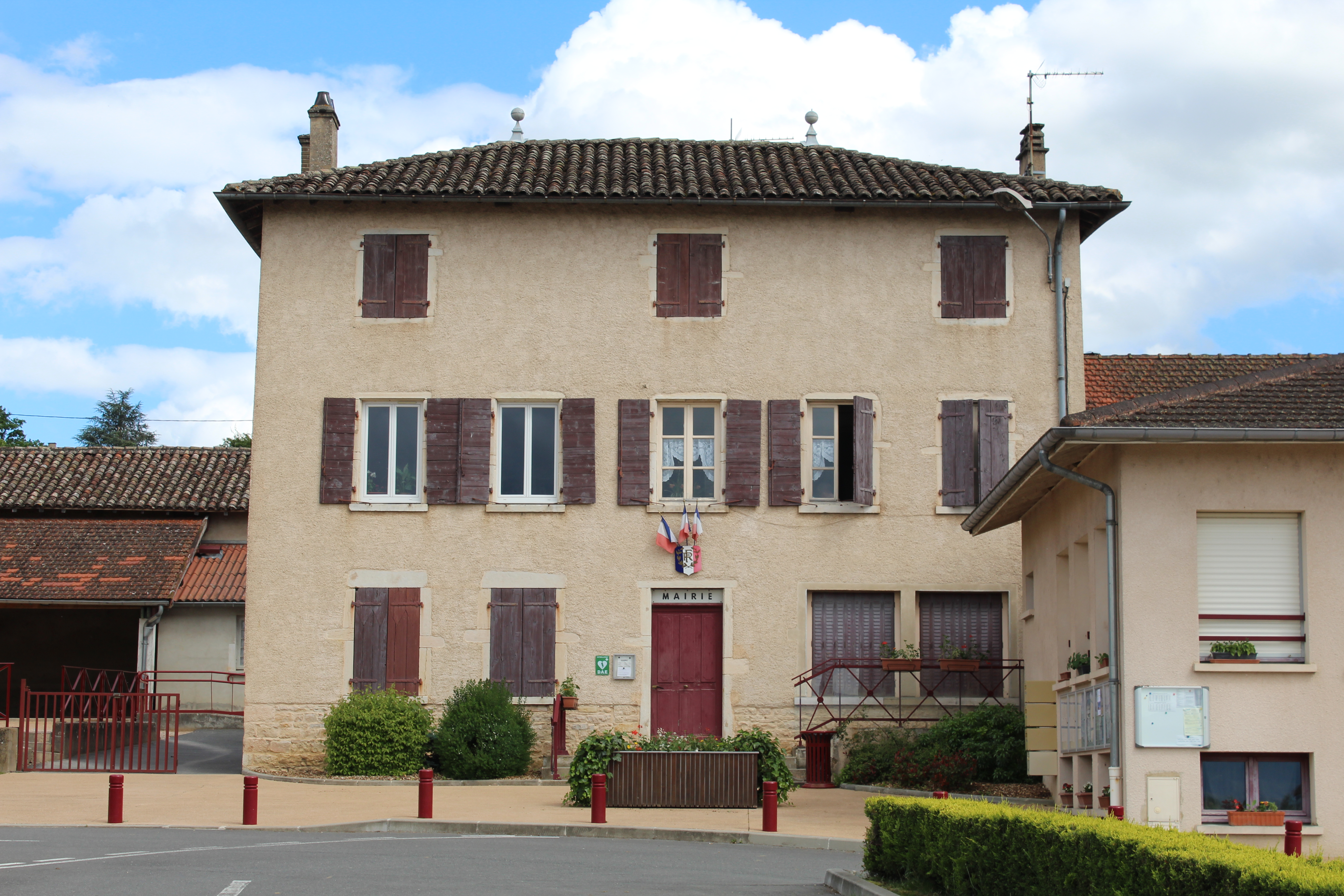
- Town hall
- Location of Genouilleux
- Location within France Location within Auvergne-Rhône-Alpes
- Coordinates: 46°07′11″N 4°47′15″E
- Country: France
- Region: Auvergne-Rhône-Alpes
- Department: Ain
- Arrondissement: Bourg-en-Bresse
- Canton: Châtillon-sur-Chalaronne
- Intercommunality: Val de Saône Centre

Government
  - Mayor (2026–32): Alain Reignier
- Area^{1}: 4.08 km^{2} (1.58 sq mi)
- Highest elevation: 231 m (758 ft)
- Lowest elevation: 169 m (554 ft)
- Population (2023): 701
  - Density: 172/km^{2} (445/sq mi)
- Time zone: UTC+01:00 (CET)
  - Summer (DST): UTC+02:00 (CEST)
- INSEE/Postal code: 01169 /01090
- ^{1} French Land Register data, which excludes lakes, ponds, glaciers > 1 km^{2} (0.386 sq mi or 247 acres) and river estuaries.

Genouilleux (French pronunciation: [ʒənujø]) is a commune in the Ain department in eastern France.

== Population ==
Historical population
Year	Pop.	±% p.a.
1968	220	—
1975	204	−1.07%
1982	253	+3.12%
1990	320	+2.98%
1999	399	+2.48%
2007	561	+4.35%
2012	598	+1.29%
2017	612	+0.46%
2023	701	+2.29%
Source: INSEE

== See also ==
- Communes of the Ain department
