= Montmerle-sur-Saône =

Commune in Auvergne-Rhône-Alpes, France

- Commune
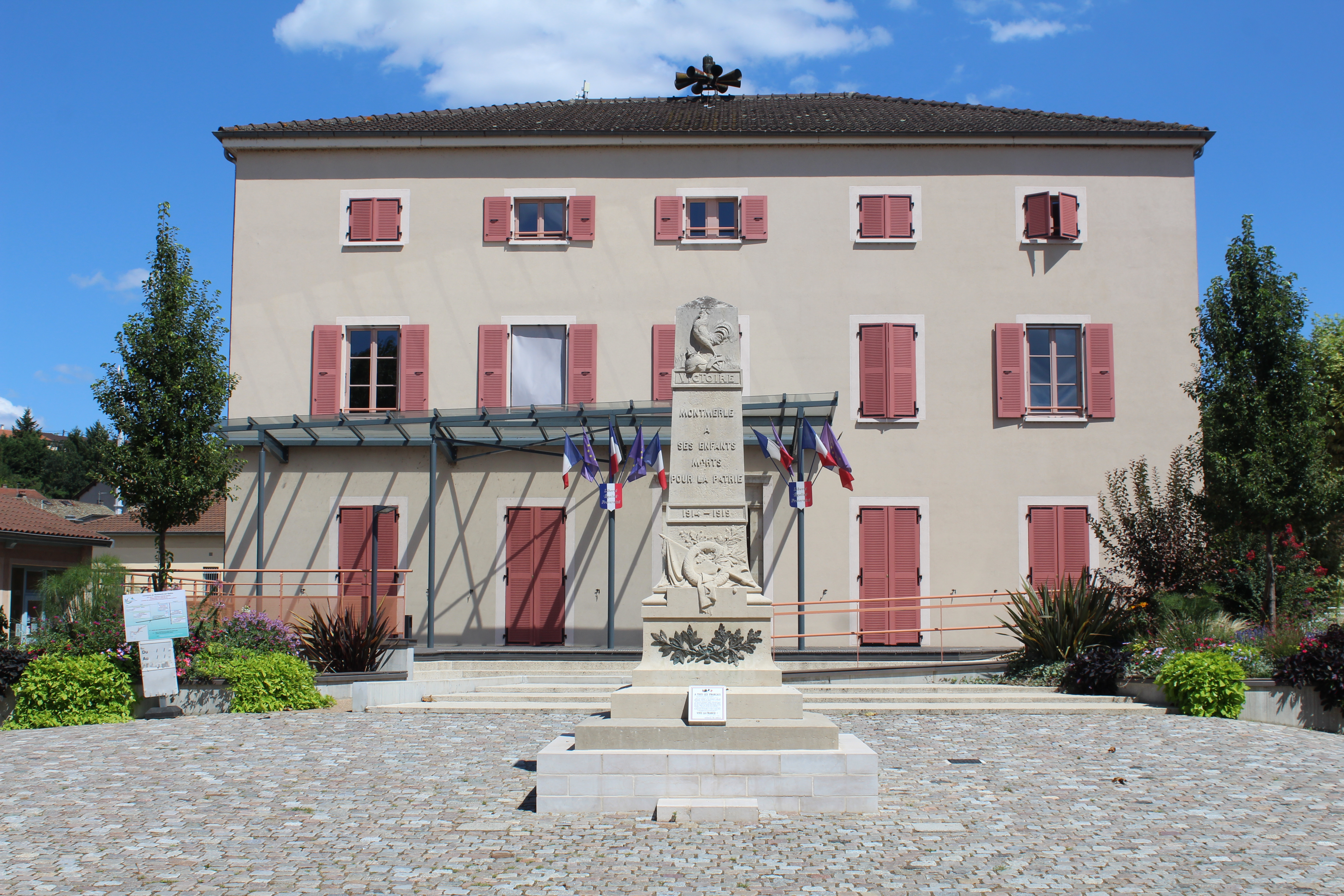
- Town hall
- Location of Montmerle-sur-Saône
- Location within France Location within Auvergne-Rhône-Alpes
- Coordinates: 46°04′52″N 4°45′32″E
- Country: France
- Region: Auvergne-Rhône-Alpes
- Department: Ain
- Arrondissement: Bourg-en-Bresse
- Canton: Châtillon-sur-Chalaronne
- Intercommunality: Val de Saône Centre

Government
  - Mayor (2026–32): Didier Rutschi
- Area^{1}: 4.16 km^{2} (1.61 sq mi)
- Elevation: 180 m (590 ft)
- Highest elevation: 227 m (745 ft)
- Lowest elevation: 168 m (551 ft)
- Population (2023): 3,799
  - Density: 913/km^{2} (2,370/sq mi)
- Time zone: UTC+01:00 (CET)
  - Summer (DST): UTC+02:00 (CEST)
- INSEE/Postal code: 01263 /01090
- ^{1} French Land Register data, which excludes lakes, ponds, glaciers > 1 km^{2} (0.386 sq mi or 247 acres) and river estuaries.

Montmerle-sur-Saône (French pronunciation: [mɔ̃mɛʁl syʁ son], literally Montmerle on Saône, before 1962: Montmerle) is a commune in the Ain department in eastern France.

== Population ==
Historical population
Year	Pop.	±% p.a.
1968	1,273	—
1975	1,505	+2.42%
1982	2,023	+4.32%
1990	2,596	+3.17%
1999	2,830	+0.96%
2007	3,795	+3.74%
2012	3,847	+0.27%
2017	3,793	−0.28%
2023	3,799	+0.03%
Source: INSEE

== See also ==
- Communes of the Ain department
