= Saint-Paul-de-Varax =

Commune in Auvergne-Rhône-Alpes, France

Saint-Paul-de-Varax Sent-Por (Arpitan)
- Commune
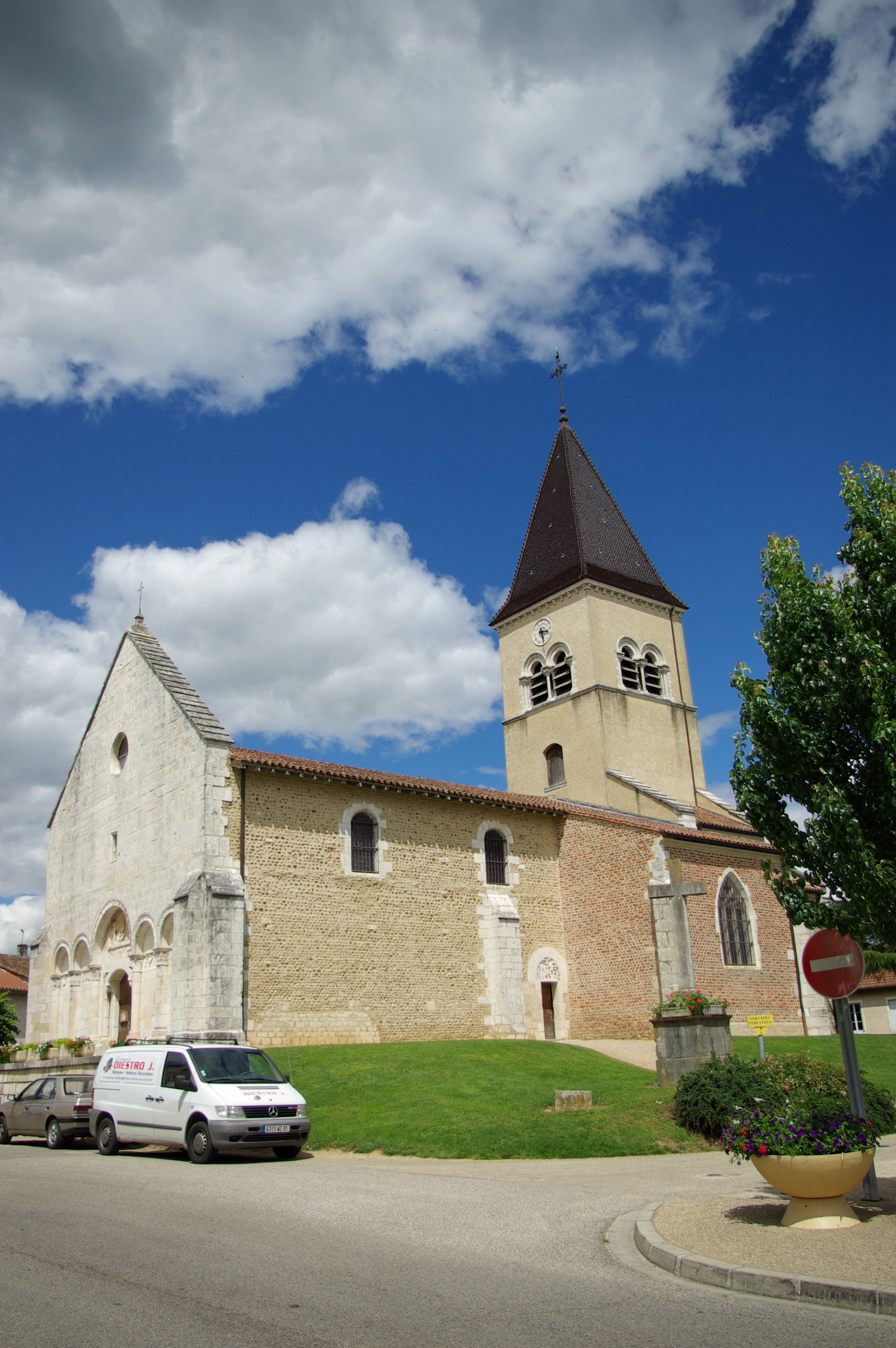
- Location of Saint-Paul-de-Varax
- Location within France Location within Auvergne-Rhône-Alpes
- Coordinates: 46°05′59″N 5°07′44″E
- Country: France
- Region: Auvergne-Rhône-Alpes
- Department: Ain
- Arrondissement: Bourg-en-Bresse
- Canton: Châtillon-sur-Chalaronne
- Intercommunality: CC de la Dombes

Government
  - Mayor (2026–32): Clément Chavet
- Area^{1}: 25.97 km^{2} (10.03 sq mi)
- Elevation: 268 m (879 ft)
- Highest elevation: 281 m (922 ft)
- Lowest elevation: 245 m (804 ft)
- Population (2023): 1,634
  - Density: 62.92/km^{2} (163.0/sq mi)
- Time zone: UTC+01:00 (CET)
  - Summer (DST): UTC+02:00 (CEST)
- INSEE/Postal code: 01383 /01240
- ^{1} French Land Register data, which excludes lakes, ponds, glaciers > 1 km^{2} (0.386 sq mi or 247 acres) and river estuaries.

Saint-Paul-de-Varax (French pronunciation: [sɛ̃ pɔl də vaʁaks]; Arpitan: Sent-Por [sɛ̃ pɔr]) is a commune in the Ain department in eastern France.

It is situated between Bourg-en-Bresse and Lyon. Its castle, which belonged to the Rivérieulx de Varax family since the 13th century, is closed to the public.

== Population ==
Historical population
Year	Pop.	±% p.a.
1968	711	—
1975	743	+0.63%
1982	1,161	+6.58%
1990	1,081	−0.89%
1999	1,187	+1.04%
2007	1,463	+2.65%
2012	1,500	+0.50%
2017	1,529	+0.38%
2023	1,634	+1.11%
Source: INSEE

== See also ==
- Dombes
- Communes of the Ain department
