= Garnerans =

Commune in Auvergne-Rhône-Alpes, France

- Commune
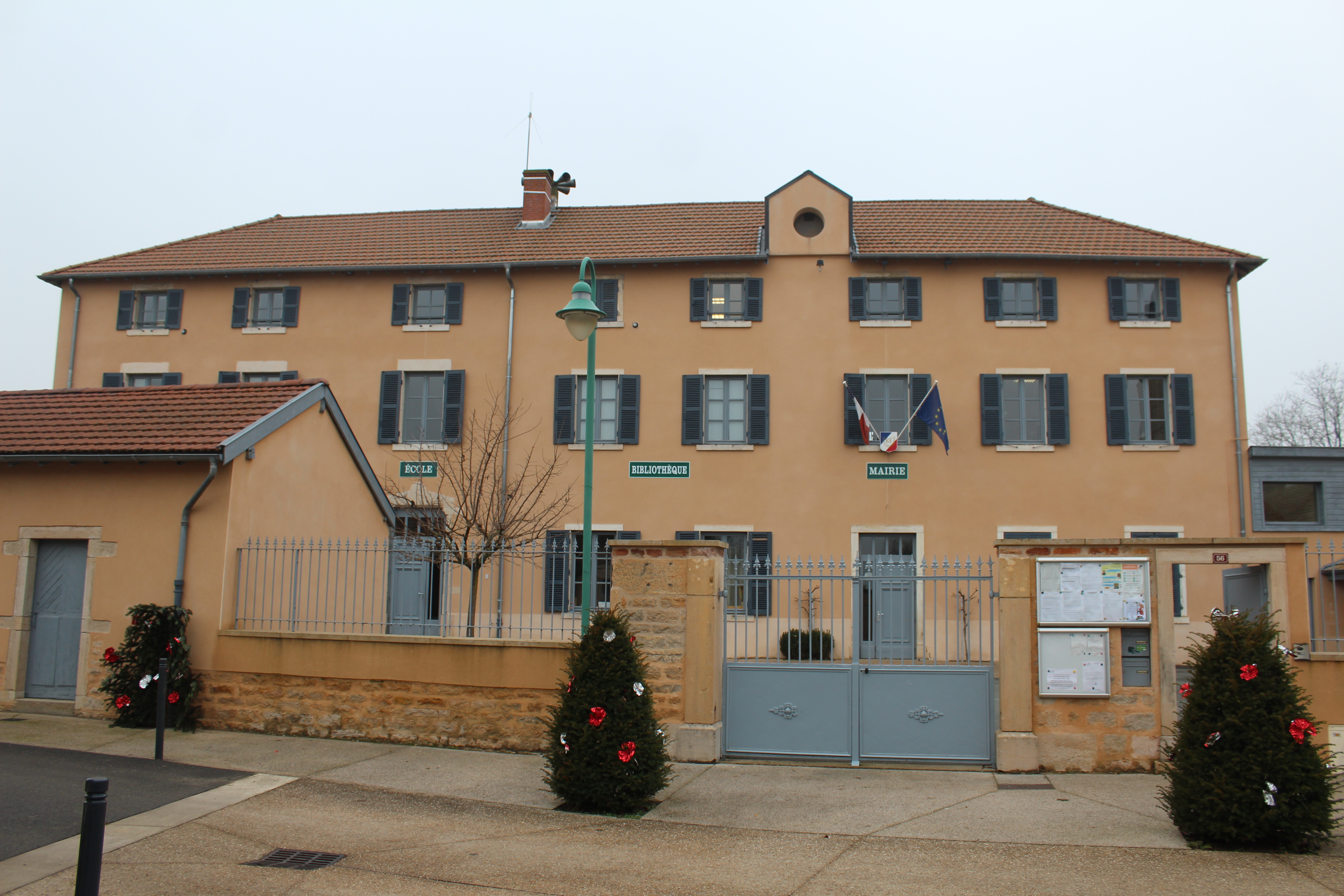
- Town hall, library, and school
- Location of Garnerans
- Location within France Location within Auvergne-Rhône-Alpes
- Coordinates: 46°12′00″N 4°50′00″E
- Country: France
- Region: Auvergne-Rhône-Alpes
- Department: Ain
- Arrondissement: Bourg-en-Bresse
- Canton: Châtillon-sur-Chalaronne
- Intercommunality: Val de Saône Centre

Government
  - Mayor (2026–32): Rene Suarez
- Area^{1}: 8.6 km^{2} (3.3 sq mi)
- Elevation: 205 m (673 ft)
- Highest elevation: 215 m (705 ft)
- Lowest elevation: 168 m (551 ft)
- Population (2023): 711
  - Density: 83/km^{2} (210/sq mi)
- Time zone: UTC+01:00 (CET)
  - Summer (DST): UTC+02:00 (CEST)
- INSEE/Postal code: 01167 /01140
- ^{1} French Land Register data, which excludes lakes, ponds, glaciers > 1 km^{2} (0.386 sq mi or 247 acres) and river estuaries.

Garnerans (French pronunciation: [ɡaʁnəʁɑ̃]; Arpitan: Gouarnerens) is a commune in the Ain department in eastern France.

== Population ==
Historical population
Year	Pop.	±% p.a.
1968	350	—
1975	335	−0.62%
1982	376	+1.66%
1990	484	+3.21%
1999	565	+1.73%
2007	632	+1.41%
2012	663	+0.96%
2017	647	−0.49%
2023	711	+1.58%
Source: INSEE

== See also ==
- Communes of the Ain department
