= Montceaux =

Commune in Auvergne-Rhône-Alpes, France

- Commune
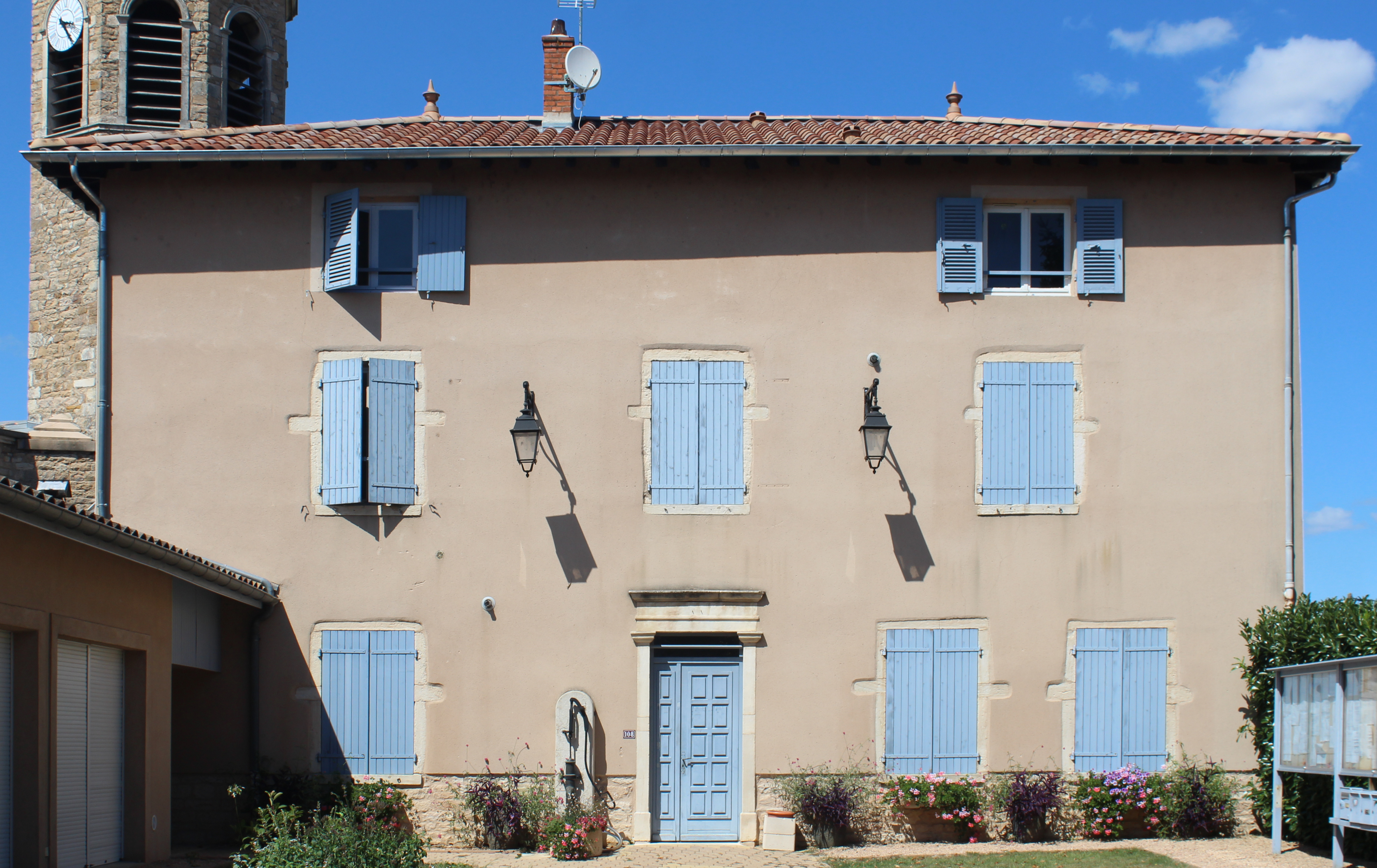
- Town hall

- Coat of arms
- Location of Montceaux
- Location within France Location within Auvergne-Rhône-Alpes
- Coordinates: 46°05′50″N 4°47′53″E
- Country: France
- Region: Auvergne-Rhône-Alpes
- Department: Ain
- Arrondissement: Bourg-en-Bresse
- Canton: Châtillon-sur-Chalaronne
- Intercommunality: Val de Saône Centre

Government
  - Mayor (2026–32): Dominique Martin
- Area^{1}: 10.03 km^{2} (3.87 sq mi)
- Highest elevation: 244 m (801 ft)
- Lowest elevation: 180 m (590 ft)
- Population (2023): 1,196
  - Density: 119.2/km^{2} (308.8/sq mi)
- Time zone: UTC+01:00 (CET)
  - Summer (DST): UTC+02:00 (CEST)
- INSEE/Postal code: 01258 /01090
- ^{1} French Land Register data, which excludes lakes, ponds, glaciers > 1 km^{2} (0.386 sq mi or 247 acres) and river estuaries.

Montceaux (French pronunciation: [mɔ̃so]) is a commune in the Ain department in eastern France.

== Population ==
Historical population
Year	Pop.	±% p.a.
1968	314	—
1975	392	+3.22%
1982	547	+4.87%
1990	672	+2.61%
1999	908	+3.40%
2007	1,054	+1.88%
2012	1,222	+3.00%
2017	1,195	−0.45%
2023	1,196	+0.01%
Source: INSEE

== See also ==
- Communes of the Ain department
