= Illiat =

Commune in Auvergne-Rhône-Alpes, France

- Commune
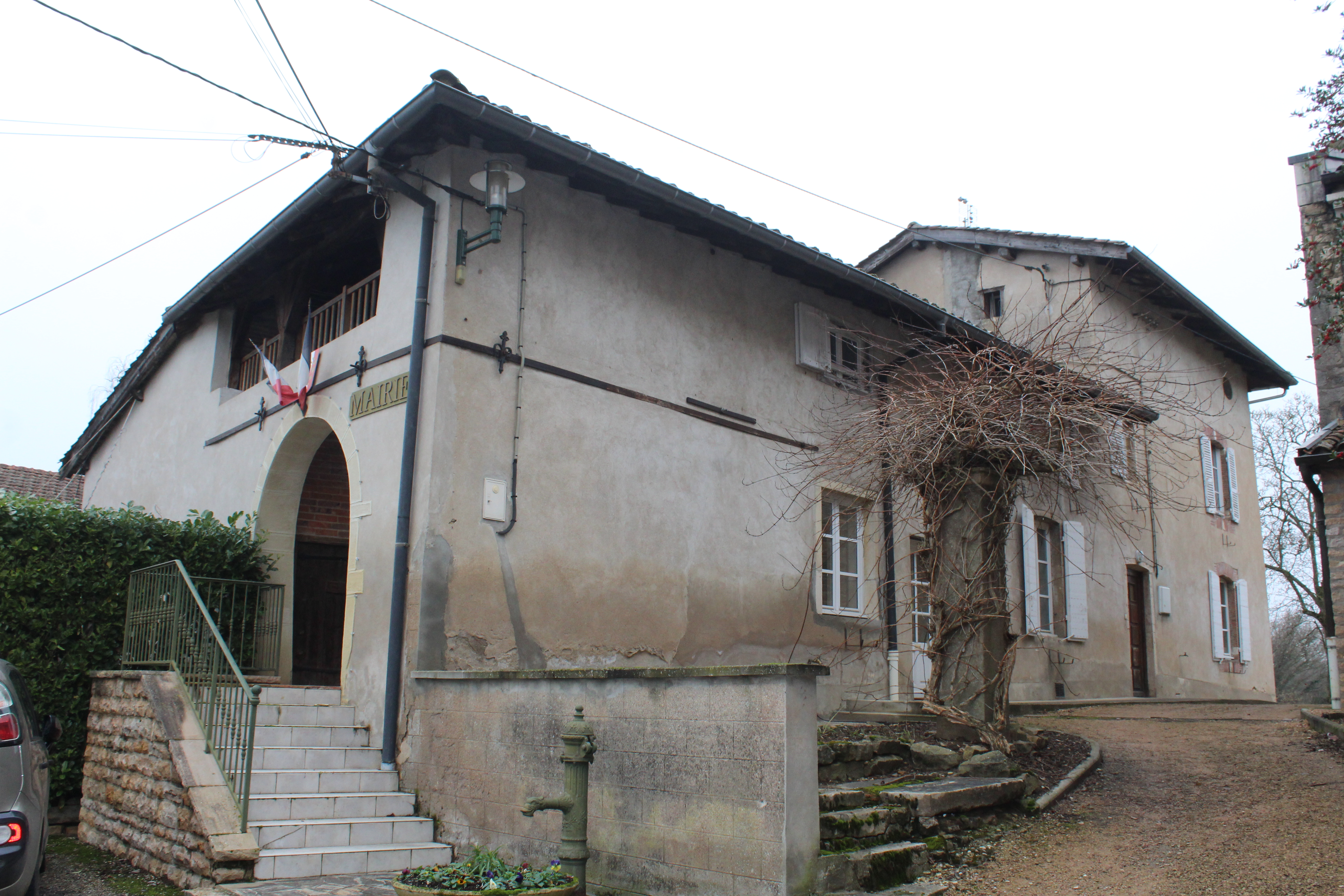
- Town hall
- Location of Illiat
- Location within France Location within Auvergne-Rhône-Alpes
- Coordinates: 46°11′28″N 4°53′21″E
- Country: France
- Region: Auvergne-Rhône-Alpes
- Department: Ain
- Arrondissement: Bourg-en-Bresse
- Canton: Châtillon-sur-Chalaronne
- Intercommunality: Val de Saône Centre

Government
  - Mayor (2026–32): Richard Labalme
- Area^{1}: 20.37 km^{2} (7.86 sq mi)
- Elevation: 241 m (791 ft)
- Highest elevation: 257 m (843 ft)
- Lowest elevation: 190 m (620 ft)
- Population (2023): 702
  - Density: 34.5/km^{2} (89.3/sq mi)
- Time zone: UTC+01:00 (CET)
  - Summer (DST): UTC+02:00 (CEST)
- INSEE/Postal code: 01188 /01140
- ^{1} French Land Register data, which excludes lakes, ponds, glaciers > 1 km^{2} (0.386 sq mi or 247 acres) and river estuaries.

Illiat (French pronunciation: [ilja]; Arpitan: Ilyê) is a commune in the Ain department in eastern France.

== Population ==
Historical population
Year	Pop.	±% p.a.
1968	435	—
1975	395	−1.37%
1982	384	−0.40%
1990	396	+0.39%
1999	466	+1.83%
2007	533	+1.69%
2012	583	+1.81%
2017	627	+1.47%
2023	702	+1.90%
Source: INSEE

== See also ==
- Communes of the Ain department
