= Thoissey =

Commune in Auvergne-Rhône-Alpes, France

- Commune
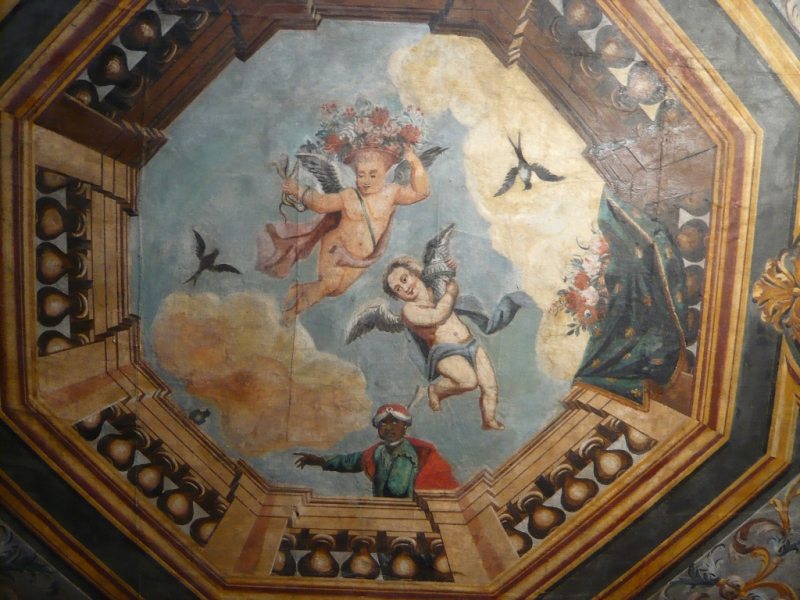
- Ceiling of the apothecary shop

- Coat of arms
- Location of Thoissey
- Location within France Location within Auvergne-Rhône-Alpes
- Coordinates: 46°10′00″N 4°48′00″E
- Country: France
- Region: Auvergne-Rhône-Alpes
- Department: Ain
- Arrondissement: Bourg-en-Bresse
- Canton: Châtillon-sur-Chalaronne

Government
  - Mayor (2026–32): Anne Turrel
- Area^{1}: 1.4 km^{2} (0.54 sq mi)
- Elevation: 177 m (581 ft)
- Highest elevation: 178 m (584 ft)
- Lowest elevation: 168 m (551 ft)
- Population (2023): 1,626
  - Density: 1,200/km^{2} (3,000/sq mi)
- Time zone: UTC+01:00 (CET)
  - Summer (DST): UTC+02:00 (CEST)
- INSEE/Postal code: 01420 /01140
- ^{1} French Land Register data, which excludes lakes, ponds, glaciers > 1 km^{2} (0.386 sq mi or 247 acres) and river estuaries.

Thoissey (French pronunciation: [twasɛ]) is a commune in the Ain department in eastern France.

== Geography ==
The Chalaronne forms the commune's southeastern border, then flows into the Saône, which forms its western border.

== History ==
This commune, formerly walled, was the second city of the principality of Dombes and housed, for this principality, a collège founded in 1680.

== Population ==
Historical population
Year	Pop.	±% p.a.
1968	1,445	—
1975	1,454	+0.09%
1982	1,481	+0.26%
1990	1,306	−1.56%
1999	1,358	+0.43%
2007	1,477	+1.06%
2012	1,589	+1.47%
2017	1,741	+1.84%
2023	1,626	−1.13%
Source: INSEE

== Sights ==
- A Lavoir of the 19th century.
- A 19th-century church, restored in 2007, housing works of the Lyonnais painter, Daniel Sarrabat (17th century); a set of six paintings dedicated to Mary Magdalene; three delivered in 1706 and three in 1713.
- The apothecary's shop of the ancient sisters' hospital, of the 18th century. In 1700, a rich draper, Etienne Pollo, is responsible for the founding of Thoissey's hospital. In 1701, the duke of Maine gave the letters patent for the creation of “L’Hôpital de la Charité”. The apothecary's shop was built between 1731 and 1735. Walnut boiseries on the walls are the work of Jean Noblet, master carpenter. The ceiling was painted by Lugnot on a marouflaged canvas (cf. photo). About 60 faience pots from Nevers decorated with a cobalt blue camaieu were used to collect the substances used by the apothecary, they were placed in niches and Renaissance style sideboards.

== Personalities ==
- Jean-Baptiste Marchand, French explorer and general officer, born and buried in Thoissey.

== See also ==
- Communes of the Ain department
