= Canton of Saint-Trivier-sur-Moignans =

Coordinates: 46°04′24″N 4°53′51″E

Saint-Trivier-sur-Moignans
- Former canton
- Interactive map of Saint-Trivier-sur-Moignans
- Country: France
- Region: Auvergne-Rhône-Alpes
- Department: Ain
- No. of communes: {{{nbcomm}}}
- Disbanded: 2015
- Area: 190.30 km^{2} (73.48 sq mi)
- Population (2012): 14,659
  - Density: 77.031/km^{2} (199.51/sq mi)

The canton of Saint-Trivier-sur-Moignans is a former administrative division in eastern France. It was disbanded following the French canton reorganisation which came into effect in March 2015. It consisted of 13 communes, which joined the canton of Villars-les-Dombes in 2015. It had 14,659 inhabitants (2012).

The canton comprised 13 communes:

- Ambérieux-en-Dombes
- Baneins
- Chaleins
- Chaneins
- Fareins
- Francheleins
- Lurcy
- Messimy-sur-Saône
- Relevant
- Sainte-Olive
- Saint-Trivier-sur-Moignans
- Savigneux
- Villeneuve

== Demographics ==
Historical population Canton of Saint-Trivier-sur-Moignans
Year	1962	1968	1975	1982	1990	1999
Pop.	5,771	6,197	6,425	8,017	9,793	11,359
±%	—	+7.4%	+3.7%	+24.8%	+22.2%	+16.0%
From the year 1962 on: No double counting – residents of multiple communes (e.g. students and military personnel) are counted only once. Source: INSEE

== See also ==
- Cantons of the Ain department
