= Ambérieux-en-Dombes =

Commune in Auvergne-Rhône-Alpes, France

Ambérieux-en-Dombes Ambèriœx-en-Domba (Arpitan)
- Commune
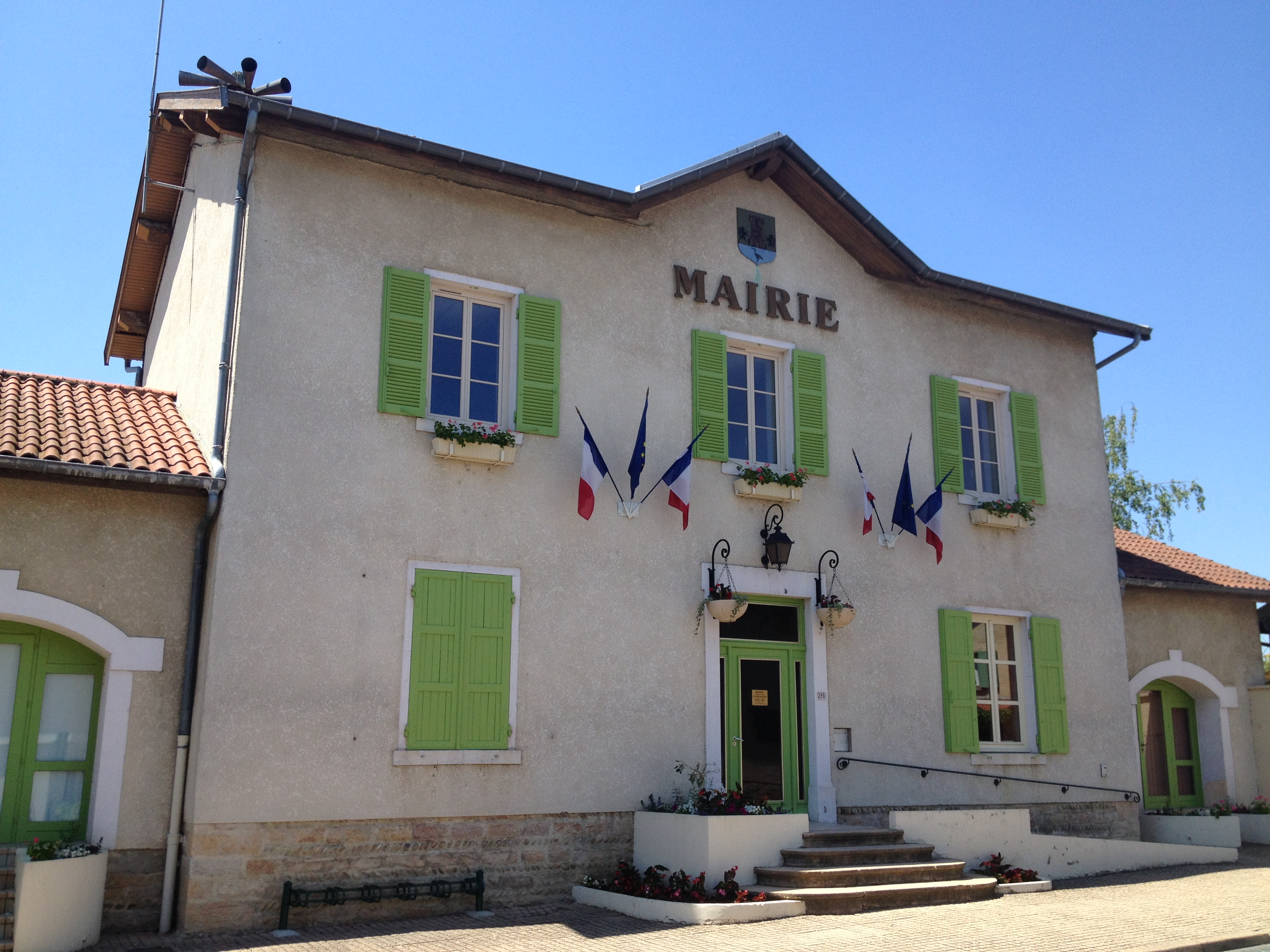
- Town hall

- Coat of arms
- Location of Ambérieux-en-Dombes
- Location within France Location within Auvergne-Rhône-Alpes
- Coordinates: 45°59′57″N 4°54′12″E
- Country: France
- Region: Auvergne-Rhône-Alpes
- Department: Ain
- Arrondissement: Bourg-en-Bresse
- Canton: Villars-les-Dombes
- Intercommunality: Dombes Saône Vallée

Government
  - Mayor (2026–32): Christine Fornès
- Area^{1}: 15.92 km^{2} (6.15 sq mi)
- Elevation: 300 m (980 ft)
- Highest elevation: 302 m (991 ft)
- Lowest elevation: 265 m (869 ft)
- Population (2023): 1,906
  - Density: 119.7/km^{2} (310.1/sq mi)
- Time zone: UTC+01:00 (CET)
  - Summer (DST): UTC+02:00 (CEST)
- INSEE/Postal code: 01005 /01330
- Website: https://amberieux-en-dombes.fr/
- ^{1} French Land Register data, which excludes lakes, ponds, glaciers > 1 km^{2} (0.386 sq mi or 247 acres) and river estuaries.

Ambérieux-en-Dombes (French pronunciation: [ɑ̃beʁjø ɑ̃ dɔ̃b], literally Ambérieux in Dombes; Arpitan: Ambèriô-en-Domba [ã.be.ˈðjy ã ˈdɔ̃.ba]) is a commune in the department of Ain in the Auvergne-Rhône-Alpes region of eastern France.

== Geography ==
As its name suggests, Ambérieux-en-Dombes is a part of the Dombes country in Ain. It is located some 10 km east of Villefranche-sur-Saône and 35 km north of Lyon. There are several access roads to the commune: the D904 comes from Savigneux in the west through the heart of the commune and the town and continues east to Lapeyrouse; the D66 road from Saint-Trivier-sur-Moignans in the north passes through the town and continues south to Saint-Jean-de-Thurigneux; the D660 comes from Rancé in the south-west to the town; and the D82 comes from Monthieux in the south-east and continues to Châtillon-sur-Chalaronne in the north-east. All of these roads intersect in or very near the town.

There is a network of country roads covering the commune which is entirely farmland outside the built-up areas. Apart from the town there is the hamlet of La Jonchay to the north-east of the town.

There are many étangs or ponds in the commune, particularly in the east but almost no waterways.

== History ==
The village was known as Ambariacum in the 6th century and the land belonged to the castles of the first Burgundian kings.

On 13 July 1922 a train of the Compagnie des Tramways de l'Ain returning pilgrims from Ars-sur-Formans derailed between Ambérieux-en-Dombes and Lapeyrouse leaving one dead and several injured.

=== Heraldry ===
Arms of Ambérieux-en-Dombes	The official emblem is still to be determined. Blazon: Party per fess, the first Or, a tower of gules port open charged with a dexter hand dorsed in benediction over a mallet and traversed by an antique crown of nine points with viscount's pearls all of Or, the tower supported by two horses rearing in sable; the second azure charged with a heron of argent with left leg raised..

== Administration ==
List of Successive Mayors of Ambérieux-en-Dombes

From	To	Name
1995	2001	Jean Giroux
2001	2014	Bernard Ravoire
2014	2021	Pierre Pernet
2021	Present	Christine Fornès

== Population ==
The inhabitants of the commune are known as Ambarrois or Ambarroises in French.

Historical population

Year	Pop.	±% p.a.
1793	553	—
1800	637	+2.04%
1806	390	−7.85%
1821	654	+3.51%
1831	644	−0.15%
1836	652	+0.25%
1841	650	−0.06%
1846	755	+3.04%
1851	744	−0.29%
1856	737	−0.19%
1861	818	+2.11%
1866	887	+1.63%
1872	823	−1.24%
1876	848	+0.75%
1881	879	+0.72%
1886	882	+0.07%
1891	862	−0.46%
1896	852	−0.23%
1901	835	−0.40%

Year	Pop.	±% p.a.
1906	805	−0.73%
1911	805	+0.00%
1921	698	−1.42%
1926	690	−0.23%
1931	618	−2.18%
1936	593	−0.82%
1946	625	+0.53%
1954	570	−1.14%
1962	588	+0.39%
1968	627	+1.08%
1975	756	+2.71%
1982	848	+1.65%
1990	1,156	+3.95%
1999	1,408	+2.22%
2007	1,544	+1.16%
2012	1,642	+1.24%
2017	1,689	+0.57%
2023	1,906	+2.03%

Source: EHESS (1793-1999) and INSEE

== Culture and heritage ==
=== Sites and monuments ===
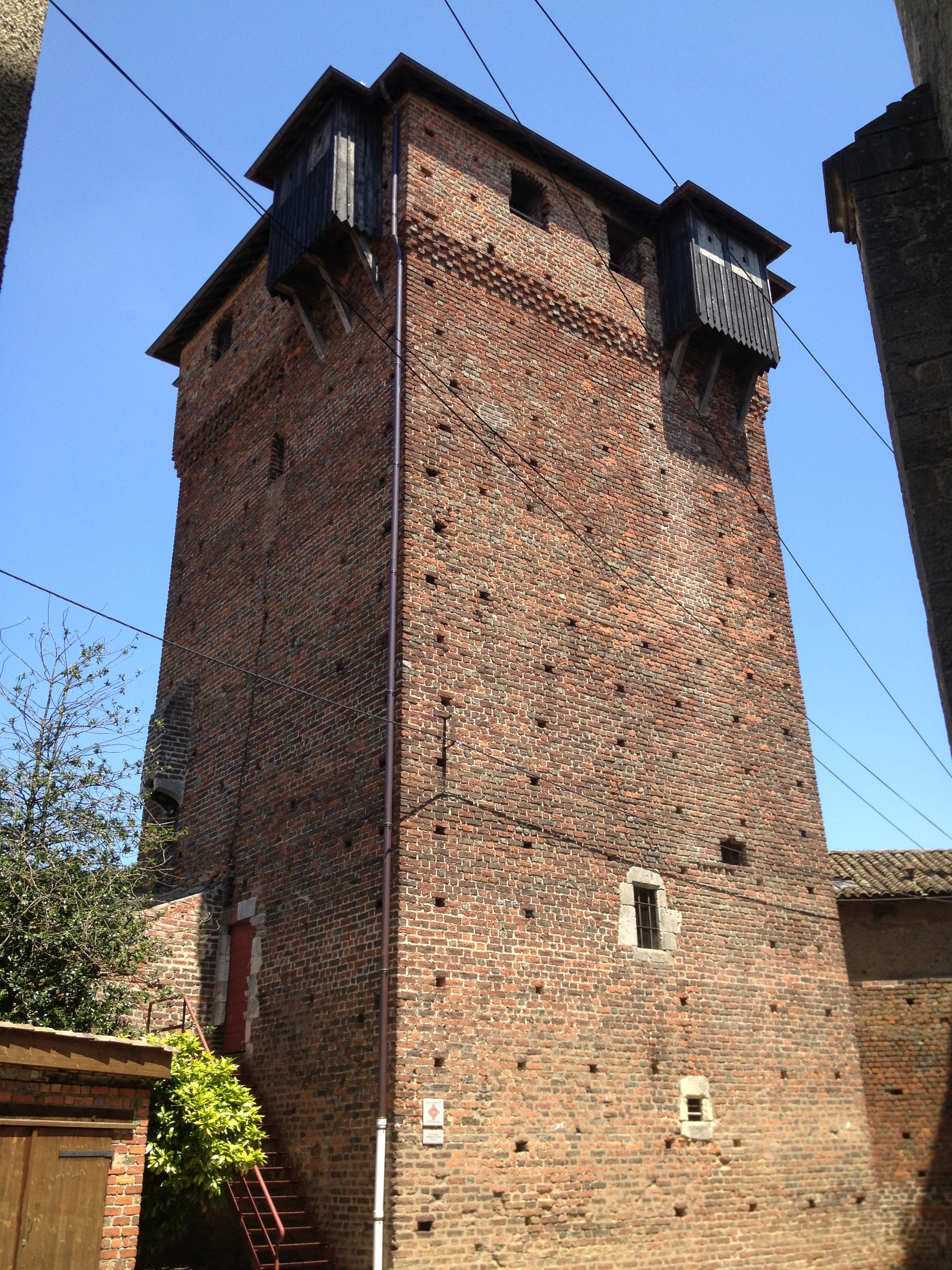
The Castle Tower.

- The Chateau of Ambérieux-en-Dombes (15th century) is registered as an historical monument. It was built between 1370 and 1376 (dendrochronological study) during the reign of Humbert V of Thoire and Villars. It is located in the centre of the village today and still has four towers - three square towers 19 metres tall and a round tower of small diameter which served as a prison. The dungeon has been completely restored with the installation of a new roof in 2010.
- The War Memorial has the feature of being topped by a rooster.
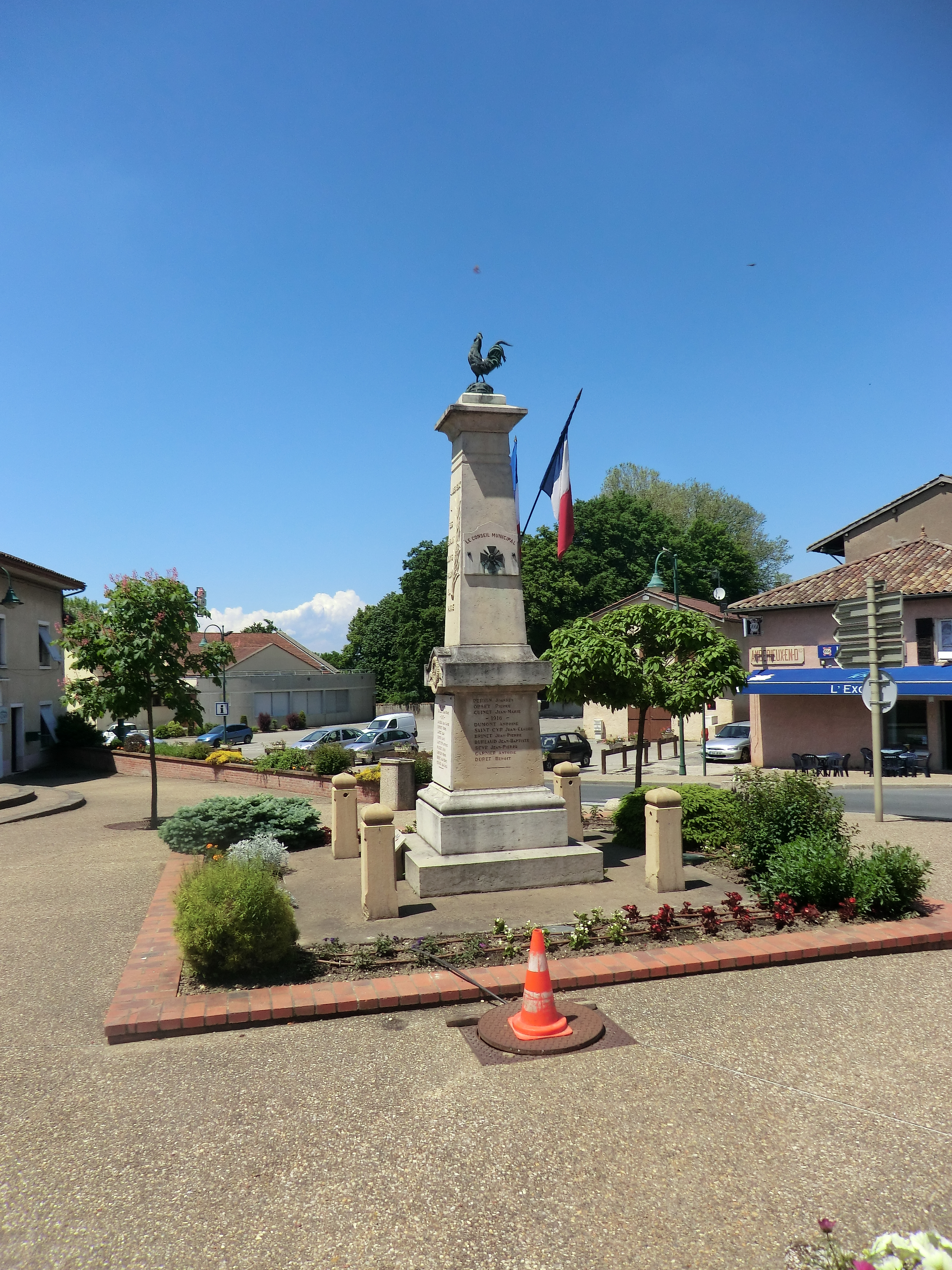
The War Memorial.

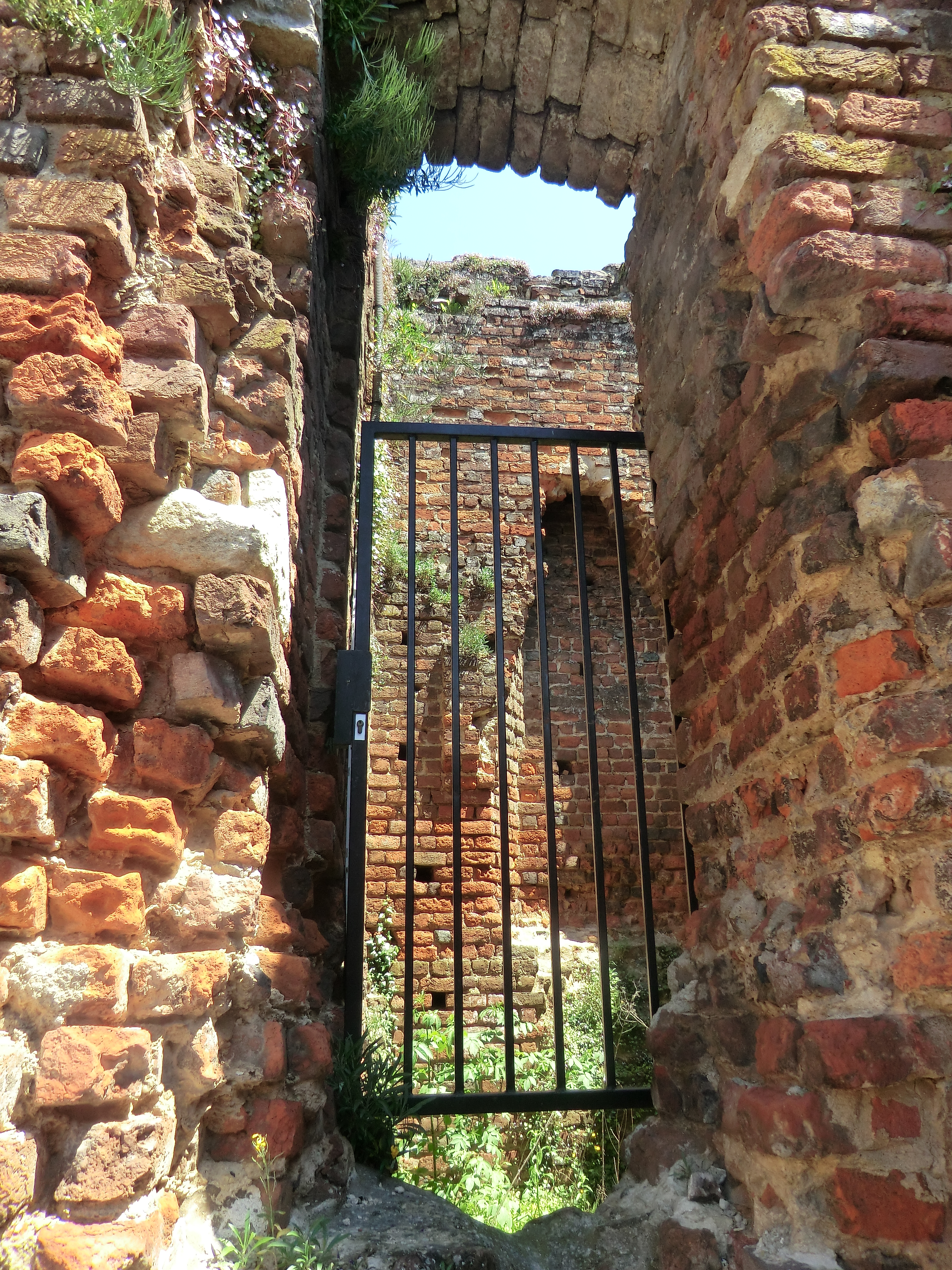
Door to the Castle.

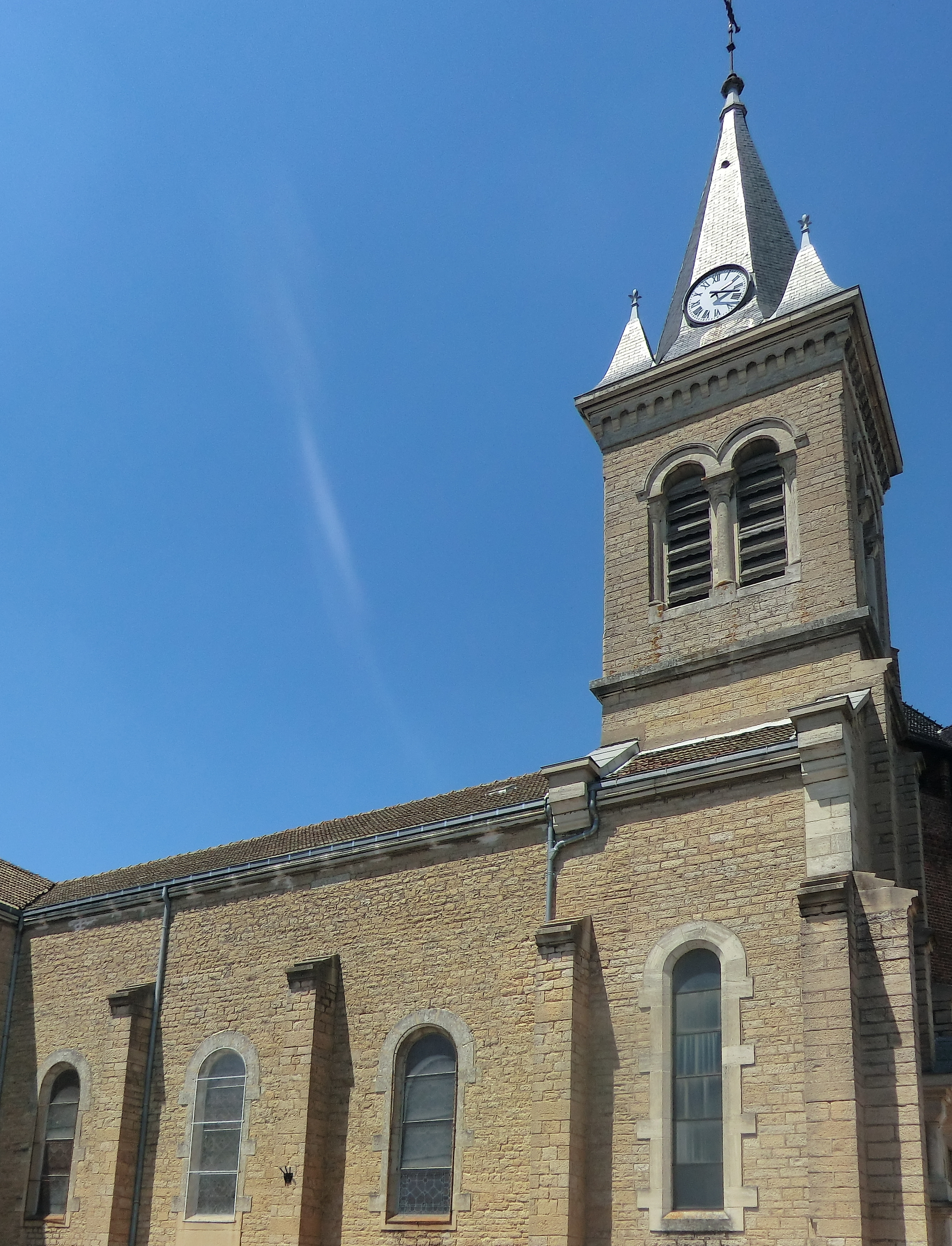
View of the Village Church.

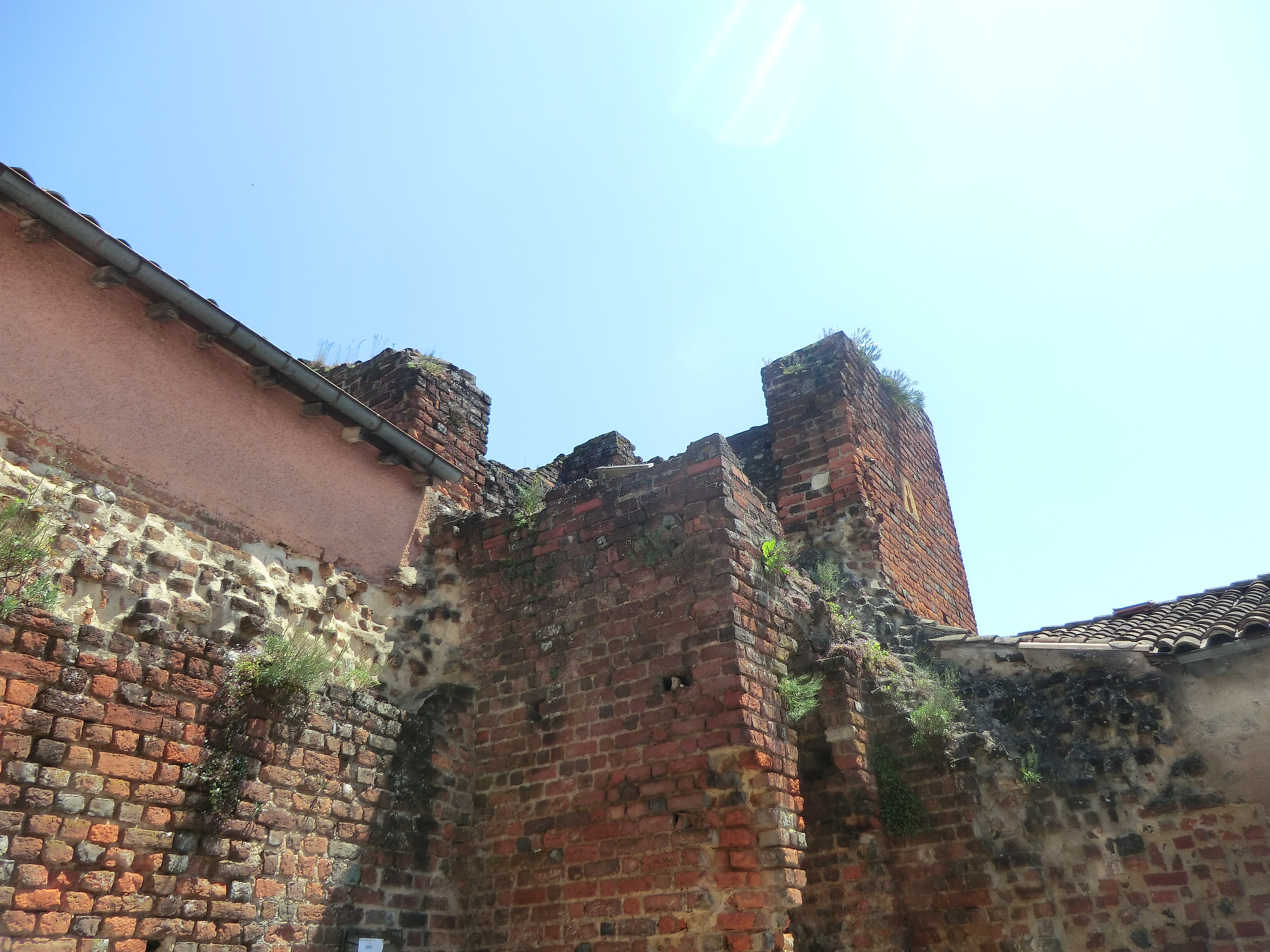
Ruins of the Castle

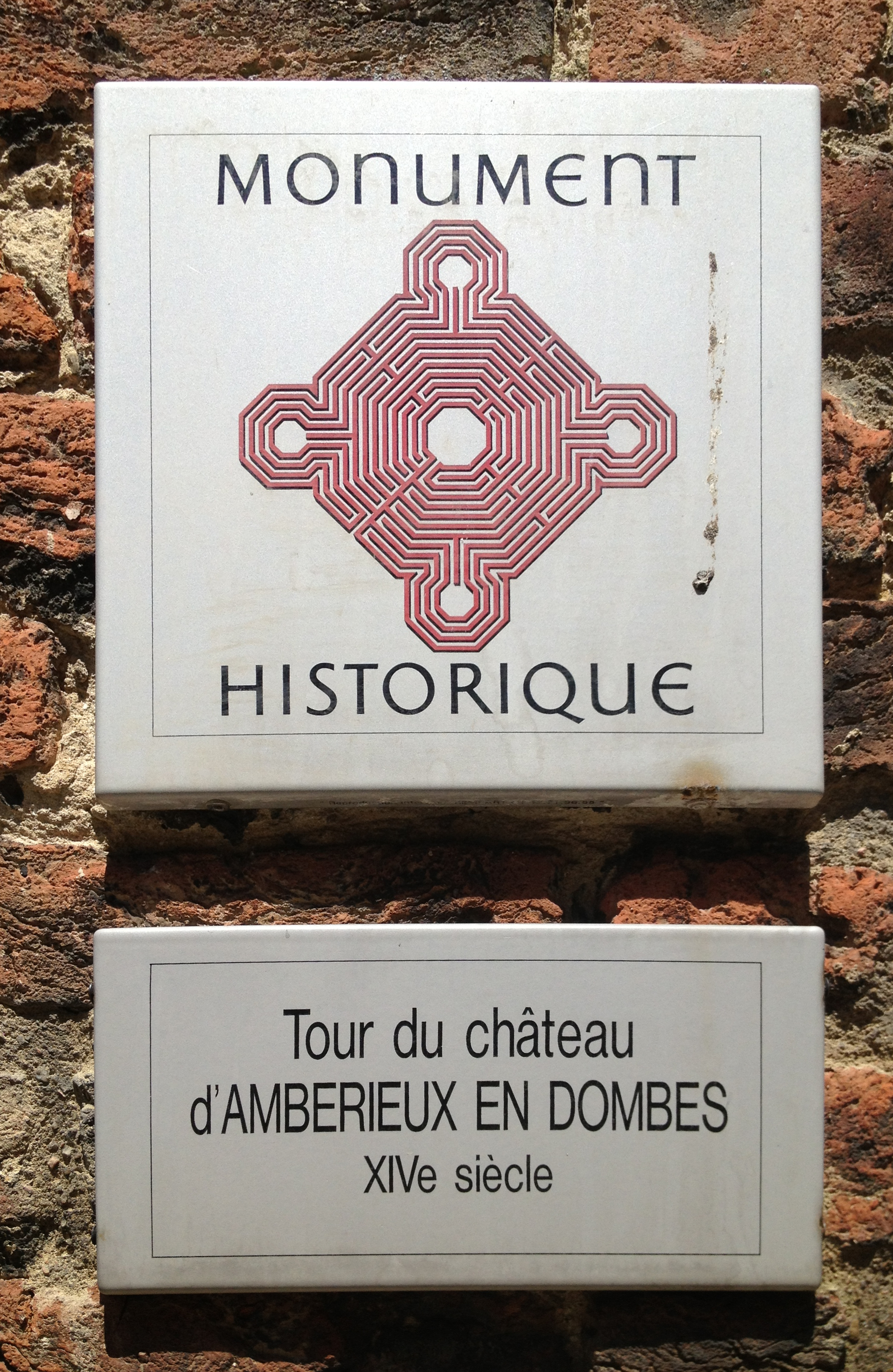
Historical monument plaque on the Chateau

=== Notable people linked to the commune ===
- Laurent Capponi (1512-1573), Lord of Ambérieux-en-Dombes
- Jean Saint-Cyr (1899-1990), French politician, born in Ambérieux-en-Dombes
- Gundobad, the 6th-century king of the Burgundians, born in the commune

== See also ==
- Dombes
- Communes of the Ain department
