= Baneins =

Commune in Auvergne-Rhône-Alpes, France

- Commune
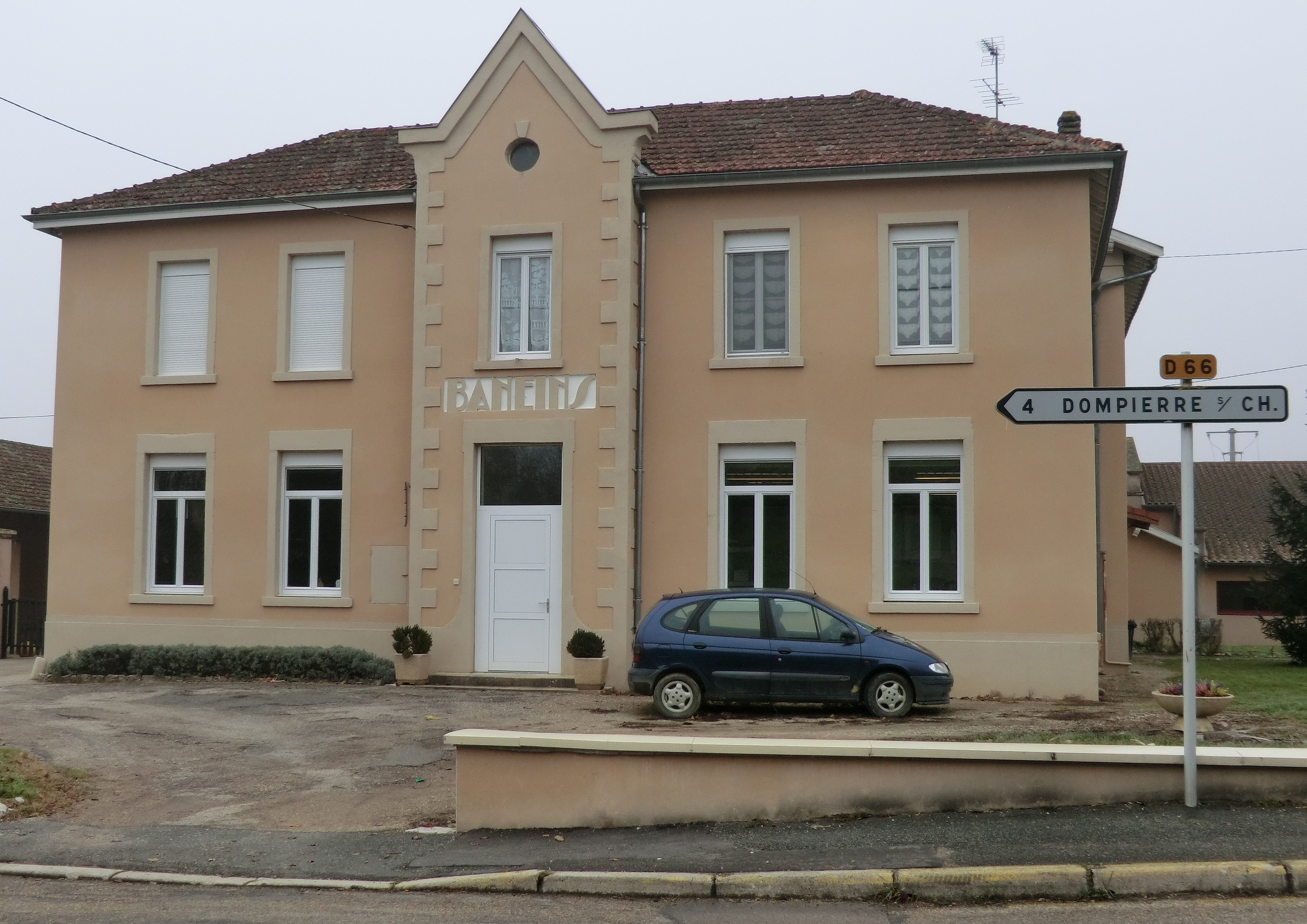
- Town hall

- Coat of arms
- Location of Baneins
- Location within France Location within Auvergne-Rhône-Alpes
- Coordinates: 46°06′38″N 4°54′09″E
- Country: France
- Region: Auvergne-Rhône-Alpes
- Department: Ain
- Arrondissement: Bourg-en-Bresse
- Canton: Villars-les-Dombes
- Intercommunality: Dombes

Government
  - Mayor (2026–32): Jean-Pierre Grange
- Area^{1}: 8.91 km^{2} (3.44 sq mi)
- Elevation: 232 m (761 ft)
- Highest elevation: 272 m (892 ft)
- Lowest elevation: 207 m (679 ft)
- Population (2023): 621
  - Density: 69.7/km^{2} (181/sq mi)
- Time zone: UTC+01:00 (CET)
  - Summer (DST): UTC+02:00 (CEST)
- INSEE/Postal code: 01028 /01990
- Website: https://mairie-baneins.fr/wordpress/
- ^{1} French Land Register data, which excludes lakes, ponds, glaciers > 1 km^{2} (0.386 sq mi or 247 acres) and river estuaries.

Baneins (French pronunciation: [banɛ̃]; Arpitan: Banens) is a commune in the Ain department in the Auvergne-Rhône-Alpes region of eastern France.

== Geography ==
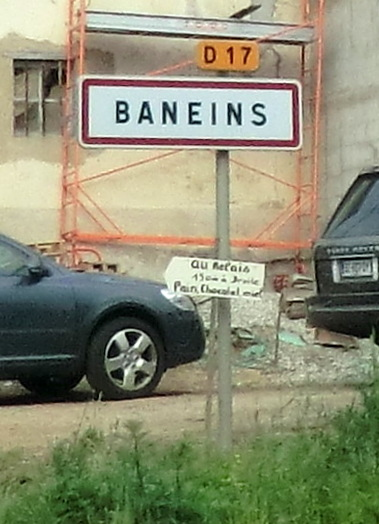
Sign at the entry to the village

Baneins occupies an area of 872 hectares 2 km west of Chatillon-sur-Chalaronne and 4 km north of Saint-Trivier-sur-Moignans with an altitude varying between 215 and 271 metres. It can be accessed by the D17 road coming from Chatillon-sur-Chalarone in the east and continuing southwest to Chaneins. The D66 road comes from Dompierre-sur-Chalaronne in the north, through the village, and continues south to Saint-Trivier-sur-Moignans. The D100 road runs off the D17 in the commune and goes to Peyzieux-sur-Saône to the west. There are two hamlets in the commune: Les Bilons and Les Bages; with almost all the rest of the commune farmland with a small area of forest in the south.

The commune is traversed from south to north by the Moignans River with the Bief Savuel and the Masanand streams joining it in the commune. The Moignans joins the Chalaronne river just north of the commune.

=== Climate ===
Baneins has a humid subtropical climate (Köppen climate classification Cfa). The average annual temperature in Baneins is 12.7 °C (54.9 °F). The average annual rainfall is 880.2 mm (34.65 in) with October as the wettest month. The temperatures are highest on average in August, at around 22.0 °C (71.6 °F), and lowest in January, at around 3.9 °C (39.0 °F). The highest temperature ever recorded in Baneins was 42.0 °C (107.6 °F) on 31 July 2020; the coldest temperature ever recorded was −15.0 °C (5.0 °F) on 30 December 2005.

Climate data for Baneins (1991–2020 averages, extremes 1987−2020)
Month	Jan	Feb	Mar	Apr	May	Jun	Jul	Aug	Sep	Oct	Nov	Dec	Year
Record high °C (°F)	17.0 (62.6)	21.0 (69.8)	26.0 (78.8)	30.5 (86.9)	35.0 (95.0)	38.7 (101.7)	42.0 (107.6)	40.3 (104.5)	36.0 (96.8)	30.5 (86.9)	23.0 (73.4)	18.5 (65.3)	42.0 (107.6)
Mean daily maximum °C (°F)	6.5 (43.7)	8.5 (47.3)	13.3 (55.9)	17.3 (63.1)	21.5 (70.7)	25.7 (78.3)	28.2 (82.8)	28.1 (82.6)	23.1 (73.6)	17.4 (63.3)	10.8 (51.4)	7.2 (45.0)	17.3 (63.1)
Daily mean °C (°F)	3.9 (39.0)	4.9 (40.8)	8.7 (47.7)	11.9 (53.4)	16.1 (61.0)	20.0 (68.0)	22.0 (71.6)	21.6 (70.9)	17.3 (63.1)	13.1 (55.6)	7.8 (46.0)	4.7 (40.5)	12.7 (54.9)
Mean daily minimum °C (°F)	1.3 (34.3)	1.3 (34.3)	4.1 (39.4)	6.5 (43.7)	10.7 (51.3)	14.4 (57.9)	15.8 (60.4)	15.2 (59.4)	11.6 (52.9)	8.8 (47.8)	4.7 (40.5)	2.2 (36.0)	8.0 (46.4)
Record low °C (°F)	−13.3 (8.1)	−13.5 (7.7)	−11.0 (12.2)	−7.2 (19.0)	0.5 (32.9)	5.5 (41.9)	7.0 (44.6)	4.5 (40.1)	1.0 (33.8)	−5.5 (22.1)	−8.5 (16.7)	−15.0 (5.0)	−15.0 (5.0)
Average precipitation mm (inches)	60.0 (2.36)	50.8 (2.00)	53.3 (2.10)	72.6 (2.86)	79.5 (3.13)	72.6 (2.86)	79.1 (3.11)	76.3 (3.00)	77.6 (3.06)	99.7 (3.93)	95.1 (3.74)	63.6 (2.50)	880.2 (34.65)
Average precipitation days (≥ 1.0 mm)	10.9	10.1	9.4	10.1	11.1	9.0	8.8	8.4	8.2	11.2	11.5	11.8	120.4
Source: Meteociel

== History ==
In the Middle Ages the parish was known as Athaneins but over time the name Baneins, which was the name of the castle, replaced it. The etymology remains uncertain: the name Baneins is based on the German man's name Bano or Banno and the suffix -eins is very common in the Dombes area and comes from the suffix -ing which is commonly added to many Germanic names.

Baneins was a lordship before becoming Viscounty then a County under Louis XIII. The County became, with Béreins and Dompierre-sur-Chalaronne, the twelfth lordship under the sovereignty of Dombes.

Of the old castle built in the 13th century by Raoul de Baneins, a knight, who gave his name to the village, there remains no trace.

The abandonment of the name Athaneins for Baneins was probably related to the identification of the locality to the hierarchy of the lords of Baneins.

== Administration ==
List of Mayors of Baneins

From	To	Name	Party	Position
1959	1977	François Girard		
1977	1995	Joanny Didienne		
1995	1998	Jean Durand		
1998	2014	Christine Gonnu	PS	Member and Vice-President of the General Council
2014	Current	Jean-Pierre Grange		

== Population ==
Historical population
Year	Pop.	±% p.a.
1968	284	—
1975	254	−1.58%
1982	307	+2.74%
1990	377	+2.60%
1999	529	+3.84%
2007	606	+1.71%
2012	560	−1.57%
2017	602	+1.46%
2023	621	+0.52%
Source: INSEE

== Economy ==
Agricultural activity is predominant in the commune. Livestock farming is still important despite a shift to grain production. The village also has a few small-scale traders.

== Culture and heritage ==
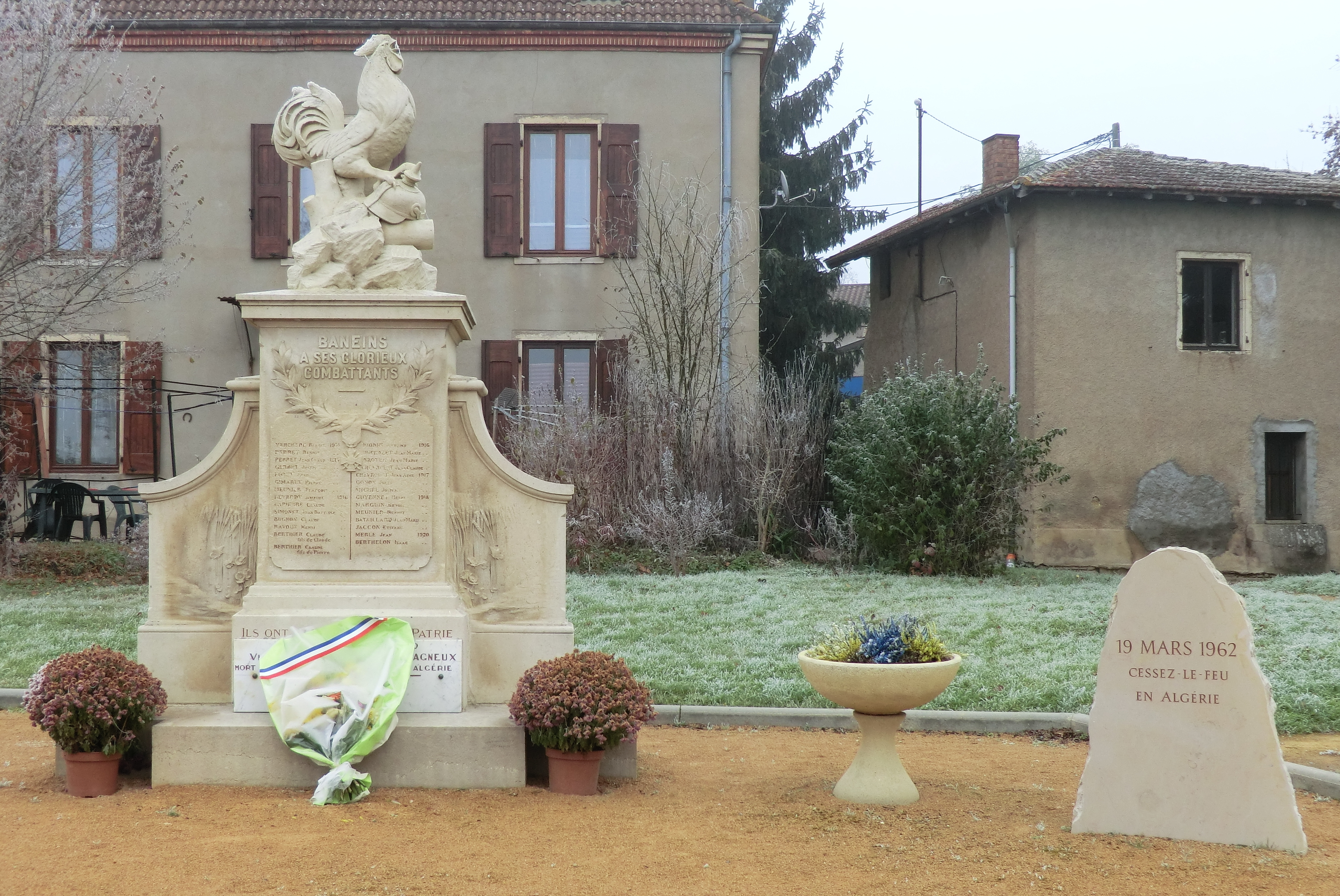
War Memorial and stone commemorating the end of the Algerian war

=== Sites and monuments ===
The Deromptey is a small hill west of the village which, on a clear day, offers extensive views - including of Mont Blanc.

The Church of St. Martin, in Romanesque style, has an apse and a portal from the 12th century. The bell tower was located above the bay of the choir but was destroyed in the French Revolution and rebuilt over the entrance. The tympanum was carved in the 19th century in honour of the patron saint of the area and is Saint Martin on horseback, dividing his cloak with a beggar kneeling and relying on a crutch.

A local lavoir (public laundry) was built in 1912.

Church of Saint Martin Gallery

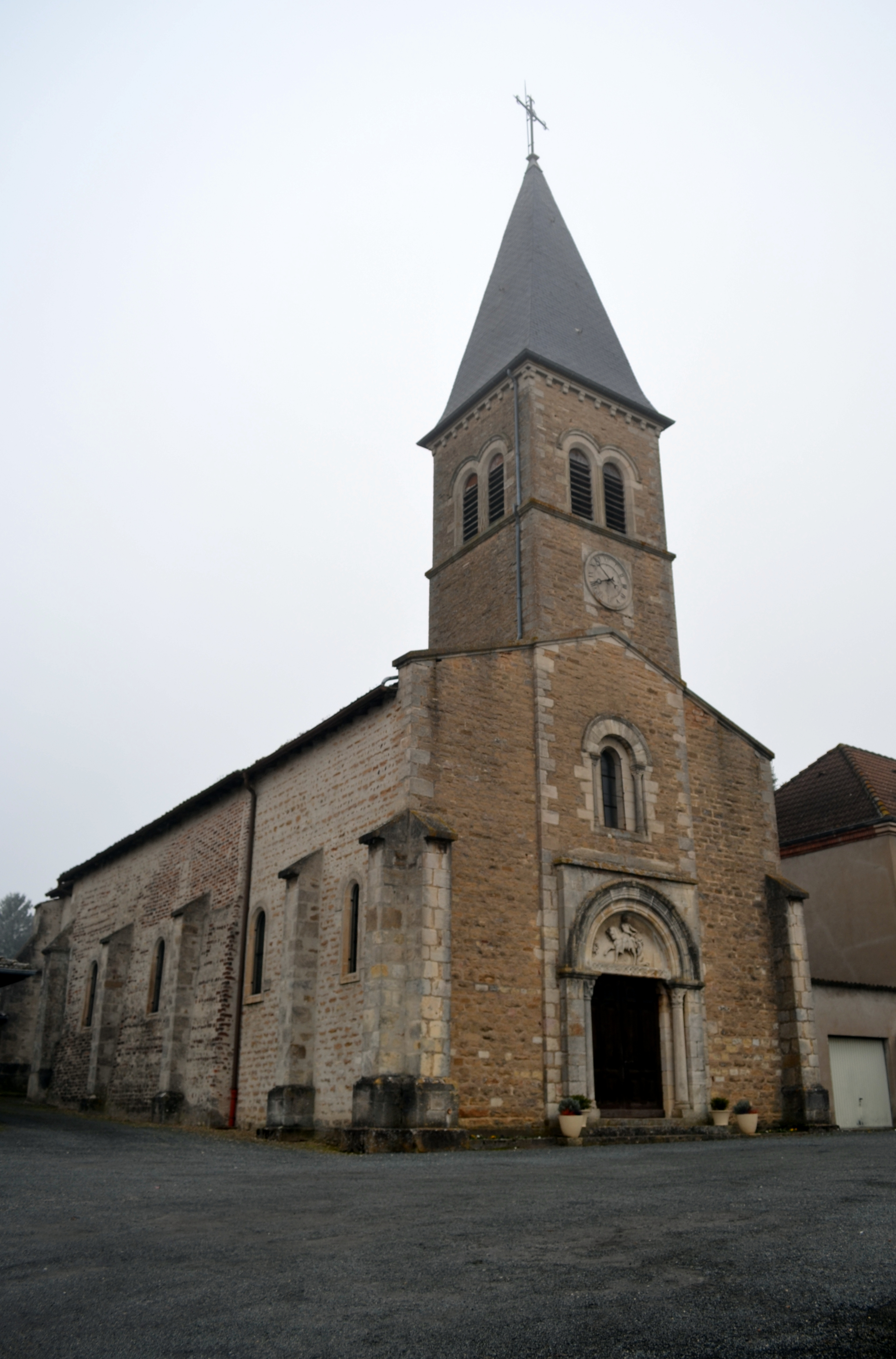
The church of Saint Martin

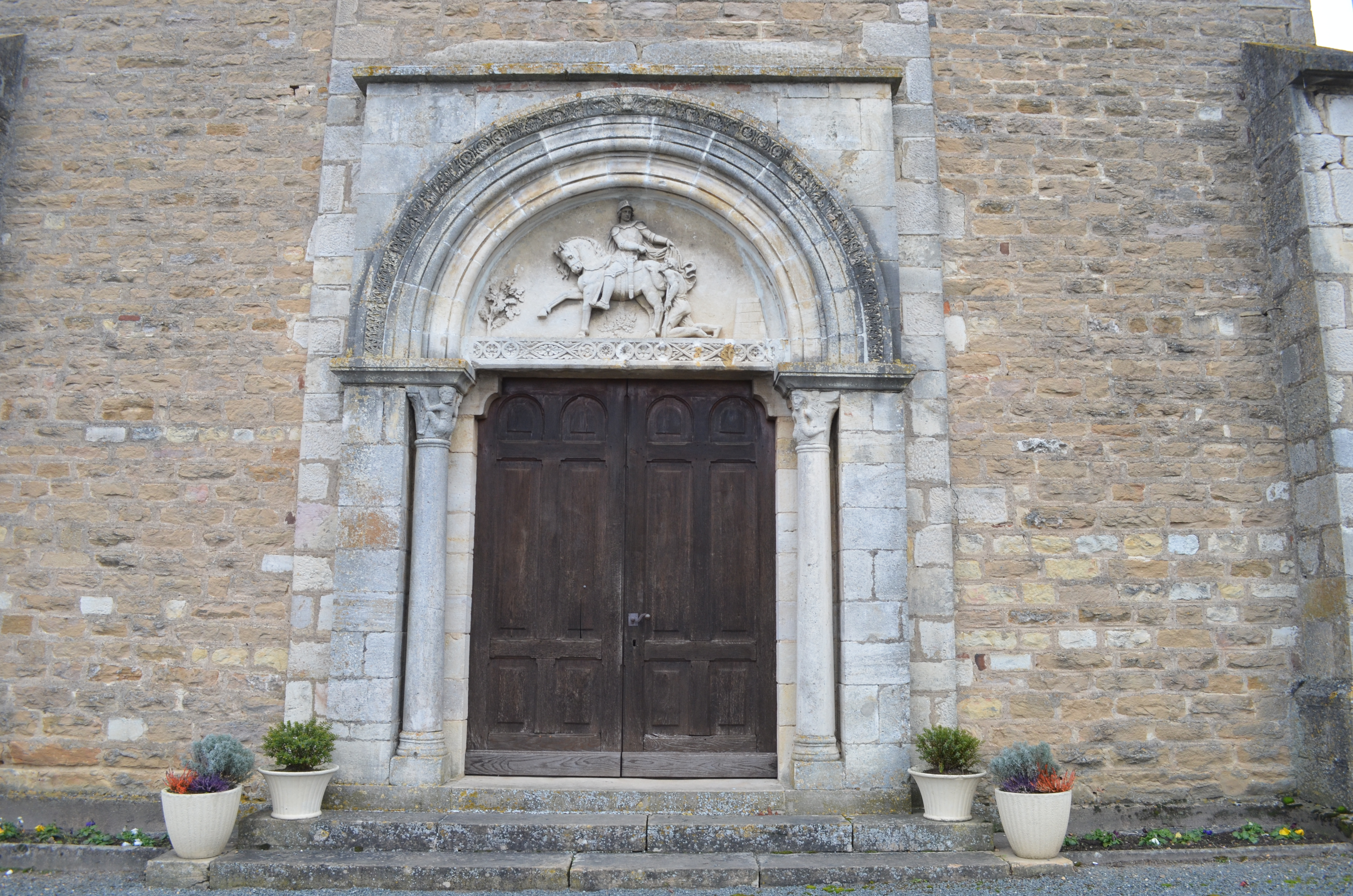
Entrance to the church

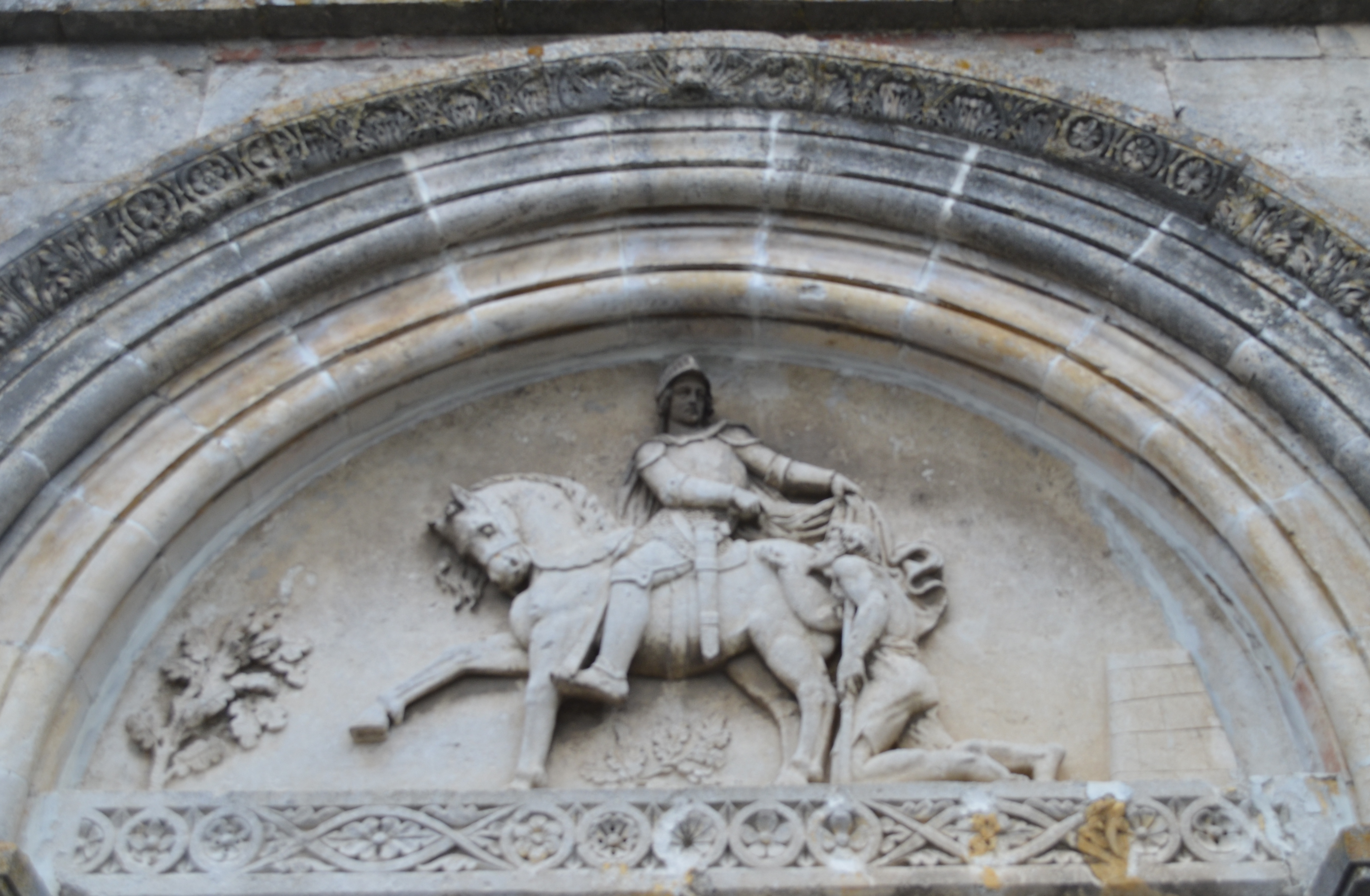
Relief of Saint Martin

== Personalities ==
- Donat Bollet (1851-1923), physician and politician, MP and senator for Ain, also Mayor of Trévoux, was born in the commune.

== See also ==
- Communes of the Ain department

=== Bibliography ===
- Tourist and Archaeological riches of the Canton of Saint-Trivier-sur-Moignans, collective work, published in 2000. (in French)

=== External links ===
- La Dombes and Baneins (in French)
- Baneins on Géoportail, National Geographic Institute (IGN) website (in French)
- Banneins on the 1750 Cassini Map
