= Relevant =

Relevant is something directly related, connected or pertinent to a topic; it may also mean something that is current.

Relevant may also refer to:

- Relevant operator, a concept in physics, see renormalization group
- Relevant, Ain, a commune of the Ain département in France
- Relevant Magazine, a bimonthly Christian magazine

== See also ==
- The philosophical concept of relevance
- Relevance (disambiguation)
