= Relevance (disambiguation) =

Relevance is a measure of how pertinent, connected, or applicable something is.

Relevance may also refer to:

- Relevance (information retrieval), a measure of a document's applicability to a given subject or search query
- Relevance (law), regarding the admissibility of evidence in legal proceedings
- Relevance logic, mathematical logic system that imposes certain restrictions on implication
- Relevance theory, cognitive theory of communication via interpretive inferences
- "Relevance" (Person of Interest), an episode of the American television drama series Person of Interest

== See also ==
- Relevant (disambiguation)
