= Saint-Marcel, Ain =

Commune in Auvergne-Rhône-Alpes, France

Saint-Marcel
- Commune
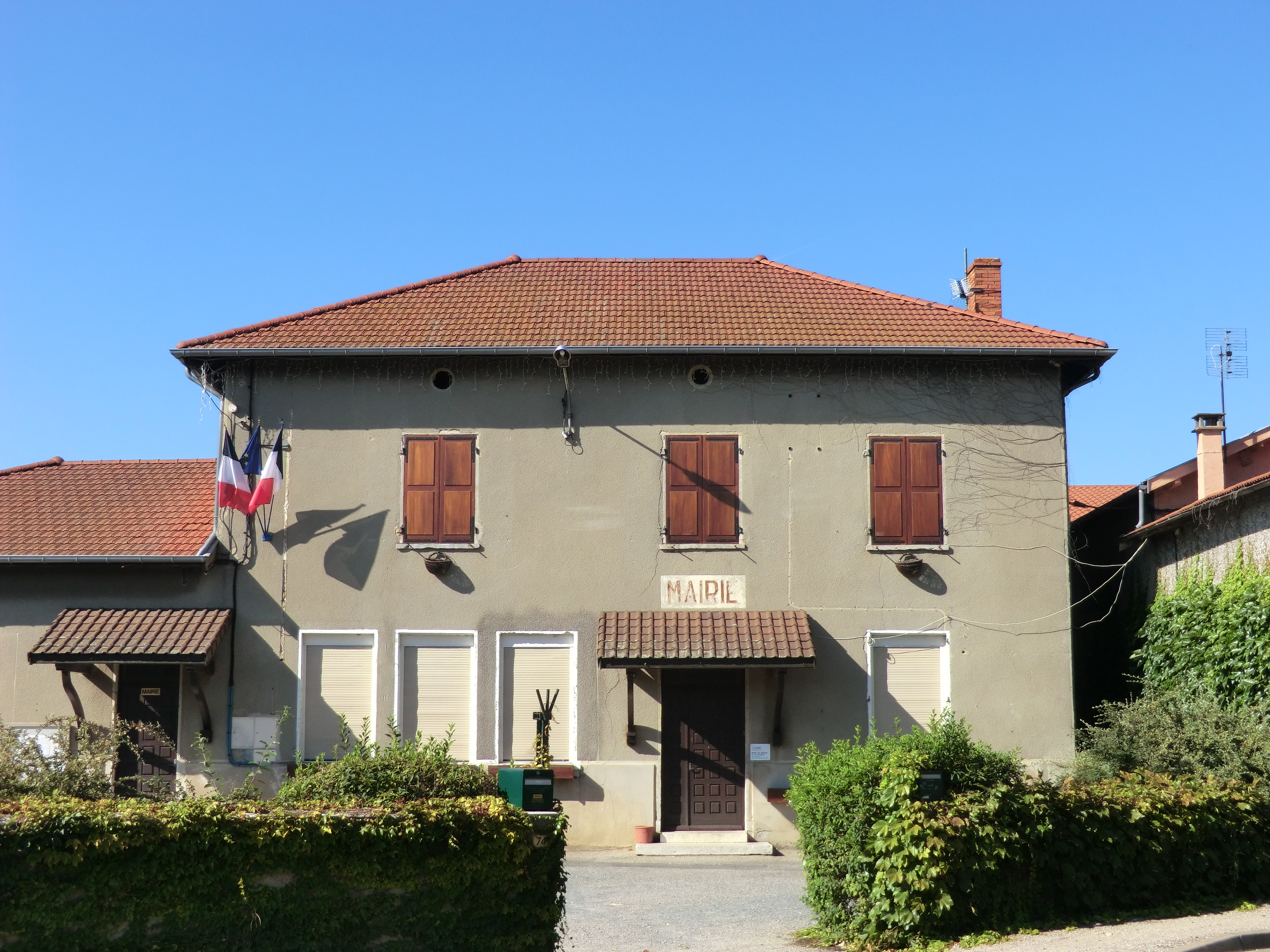
- Town hall
- Location of Saint-Marcel
- Location within France Location within Auvergne-Rhône-Alpes
- Coordinates: 45°56′58″N 4°59′17″E
- Country: France
- Region: Auvergne-Rhône-Alpes
- Department: Ain
- Arrondissement: Bourg-en-Bresse
- Canton: Villars-les-Dombes

Government
  - Mayor (2026–32): Jacky Nouet
- Area^{1}: 11.64 km^{2} (4.49 sq mi)
- Elevation: 286 m (938 ft)
- Highest elevation: 292 m (958 ft)
- Lowest elevation: 278 m (912 ft)
- Population (2023): 1,340
  - Density: 115/km^{2} (298/sq mi)
- Time zone: UTC+01:00 (CET)
  - Summer (DST): UTC+02:00 (CEST)
- INSEE/Postal code: 01371 /01390
- ^{1} French Land Register data, which excludes lakes, ponds, glaciers > 1 km^{2} (0.386 sq mi or 247 acres) and river estuaries.

Saint-Marcel (French pronunciation: [sɛ̃ maʁsɛl]; also known as Saint-Marcel-en-Dombes, [sɛ̃ maʁsɛl ɑ̃ dɔ̃b], literally Saint-Marcel in Dombes) is a commune in the Ain department in eastern France.

== Population ==
Historical population
Year	Pop.	±% p.a.
1968	200	—
1975	209	+0.63%
1982	274	+3.94%
1990	786	+14.08%
1999	1,059	+3.37%
2007	1,202	+1.60%
2012	1,197	−0.08%
2017	1,279	+1.33%
2023	1,340	+0.78%
Source: INSEE

== See also ==
- Communes of the Ain department
