= Civrieux =

Commune in Auvergne-Rhône-Alpes, France

Civrieux Sivriœx (Arpitan)
- Commune
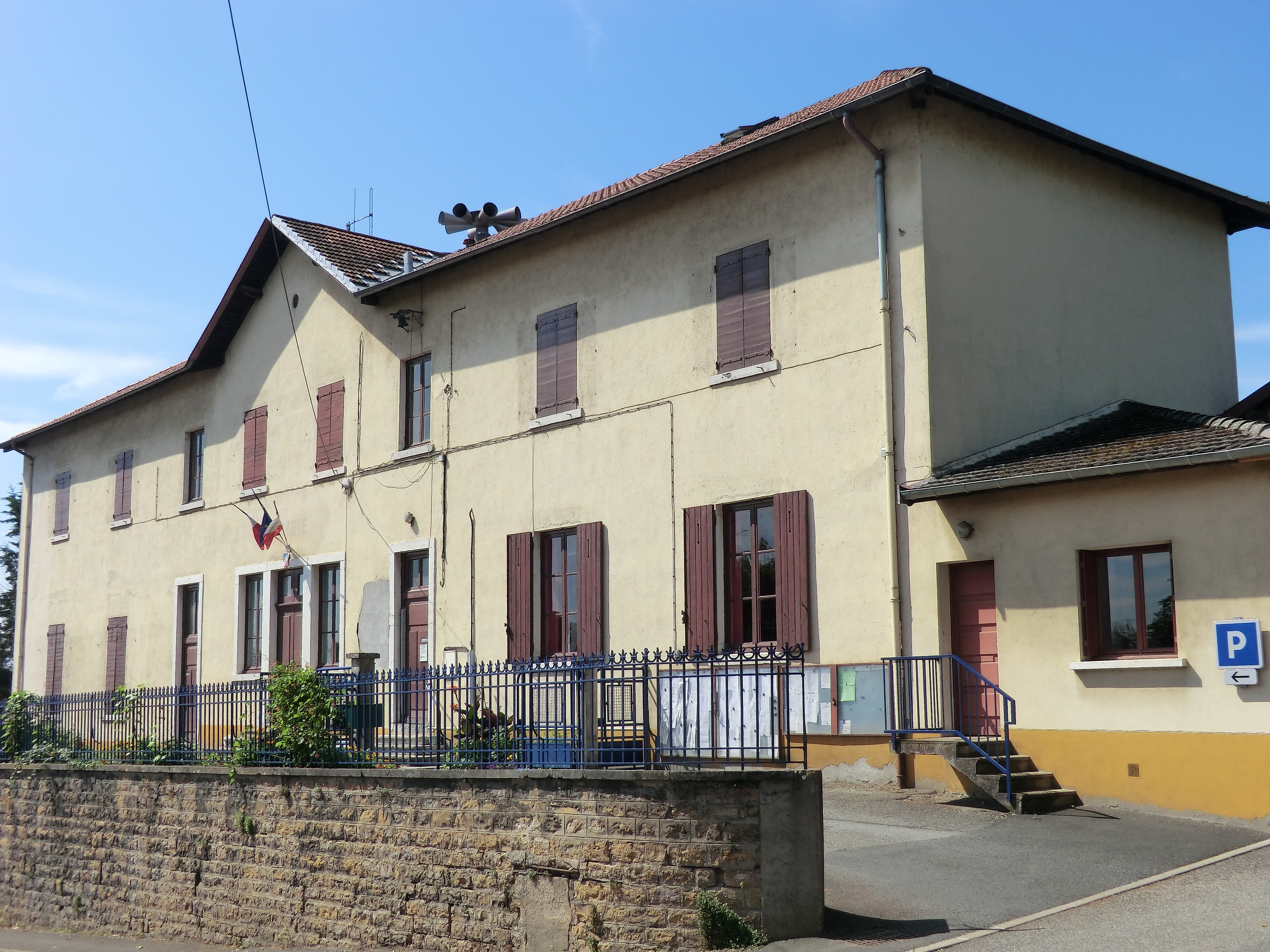
- Town hall
- Location of Civrieux
- Location within France Location within Auvergne-Rhône-Alpes
- Coordinates: 45°55′19″N 4°52′54″E
- Country: France
- Region: Auvergne-Rhône-Alpes
- Department: Ain
- Arrondissement: Bourg-en-Bresse
- Canton: Villars-les-Dombes
- Intercommunality: Dombes-Saône Vallée

Government
  - Mayor (2026–2032): Michel Muller
- Area^{1}: 19.76 km^{2} (7.63 sq mi)
- Elevation: 280 m (920 ft)
- Highest elevation: 311 m (1,020 ft)
- Lowest elevation: 225 m (738 ft)
- Population (2023): 2,016
  - Density: 102.0/km^{2} (264.2/sq mi)
- Time zone: UTC+01:00 (CET)
  - Summer (DST): UTC+02:00 (CEST)
- INSEE/Postal code: 01105 /01390
- ^{1} French Land Register data, which excludes lakes, ponds, glaciers > 1 km^{2} (0.386 sq mi or 247 acres) and river estuaries.

Civrieux (French pronunciation: [sivʁijø]; Arpitan: Sivriœx [siv.ˈrjy]) is a commune in Ain, a department in eastern France.

== Geography ==
Civrieux is located in Dombes, a natural region on the southwest part of Ain. It lies a few kilometres north of Lyon.

== Population ==
Historical population
Year	Pop.	±% p.a.
1968	492	—
1975	536	+1.23%
1982	763	+5.17%
1990	954	+2.83%
1999	1,079	+1.38%
2007	1,341	+2.75%
2012	1,394	+0.78%
2017	1,680	+3.80%
2023	2,016	+3.09%
Source: INSEE

== See also ==
- Communes of the Ain department
