= Sainte-Olive =

Commune in Auvergne-Rhône-Alpes, France

- Commune
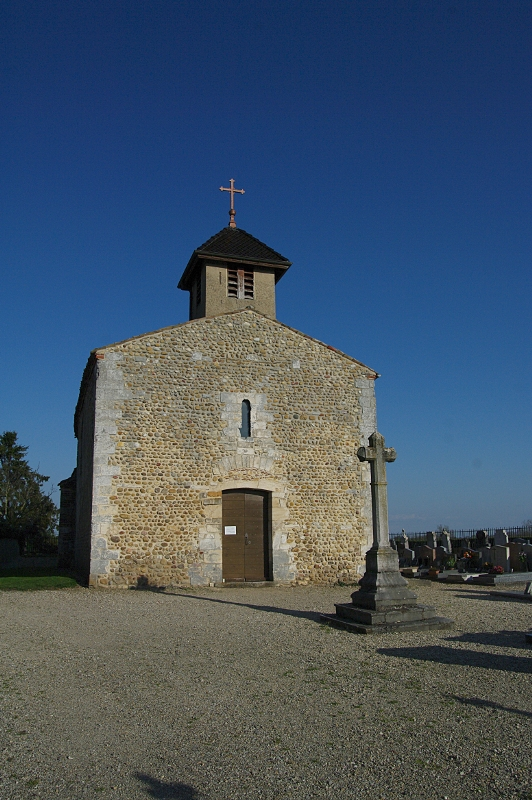

- Coat of arms
- Location of Sainte-Olive
- Location within France Location within Auvergne-Rhône-Alpes
- Coordinates: 46°01′10″N 4°56′03″E
- Country: France
- Region: Auvergne-Rhône-Alpes
- Department: Ain
- Arrondissement: Bourg-en-Bresse
- Canton: Villars-les-Dombes
- Intercommunality: CC de la Dombes

Government
  - Mayor (2026–32): Caroline Bastoul
- Area^{1}: 7.39 km^{2} (2.85 sq mi)
- Elevation: 302 m (991 ft)
- Highest elevation: 301 m (988 ft)
- Lowest elevation: 281 m (922 ft)
- Population (2023): 357
  - Density: 48.3/km^{2} (125/sq mi)
- Time zone: UTC+01:00 (CET)
  - Summer (DST): UTC+02:00 (CEST)
- INSEE/Postal code: 01382 /01330
- ^{1} French Land Register data, which excludes lakes, ponds, glaciers > 1 km^{2} (0.386 sq mi or 247 acres) and river estuaries.

Sainte-Olive (French pronunciation: [sɛ̃t ɔliv]; Arpitan: Sent-Ôleva) is a commune in the Ain department in eastern France.

== Population ==
Historical population
Year	Pop.	±% p.a.
1968	110	—
1975	115	+0.64%
1982	157	+4.55%
1990	196	+2.81%
1999	253	+2.88%
2007	304	+2.32%
2012	296	−0.53%
2017	283	−0.89%
2023	357	+3.95%
Source: INSEE

== People from Sainte-Olive ==
- Jacques Ozanam, the French mathematician, was born on 16 June 1640 in Sainte-Olive and died on 3 April 1718 in Paris.

== See also ==
- Communes of the Ain department
- Dombes
