= Francheleins =

Commune in Auvergne-Rhône-Alpes, France

- Commune
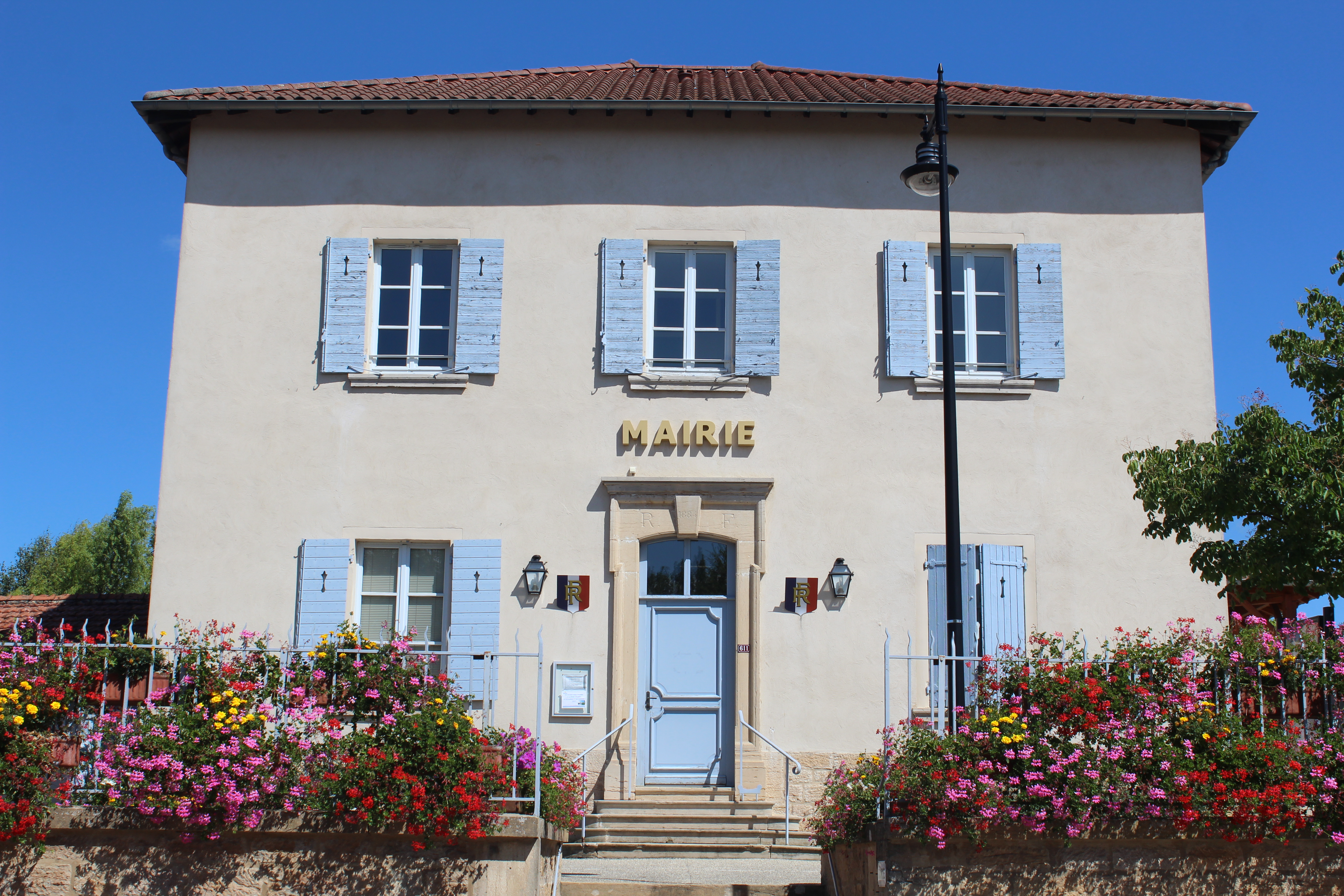
- Town hall
- Location of Francheleins
- Location within France Location within Auvergne-Rhône-Alpes
- Coordinates: 46°04′28″N 4°48′33″E
- Country: France
- Region: Auvergne-Rhône-Alpes
- Department: Ain
- Arrondissement: Bourg-en-Bresse
- Canton: Villars-les-Dombes
- Intercommunality: Val de Saône Centre

Government
  - Mayor (2026–2032): Jean-Michel Lux
- Area^{1}: 13.56 km^{2} (5.24 sq mi)
- Elevation: 213 m (699 ft)
- Highest elevation: 269 m (883 ft)
- Lowest elevation: 209 m (686 ft)
- Population (2023): 1,597
  - Density: 117.8/km^{2} (305.0/sq mi)
- Time zone: UTC+01:00 (CET)
  - Summer (DST): UTC+02:00 (CEST)
- INSEE/Postal code: 01165 /01090
- ^{1} French Land Register data, which excludes lakes, ponds, glaciers > 1 km^{2} (0.386 sq mi or 247 acres) and river estuaries.

Francheleins (French pronunciation: [fʁɑ̃ʃlɛ̃], before 1998: Amareins-Francheleins-Cesseins) is a commune in the Ain department in eastern France.

== Population ==
Historical population
Year	Pop.	±% p.a.
1968	355	—
1975	415	+2.26%
1982	572	+4.69%
1990	826	+4.70%
1999	994	+2.08%
2007	1,165	+2.00%
2012	1,450	+4.47%
2017	1,611	+2.13%
2023	1,597	−0.15%
Source: INSEE

== See also ==
- Communes of the Ain department
