= Fareins =

Commune in Auvergne-Rhône-Alpes, France

- Commune
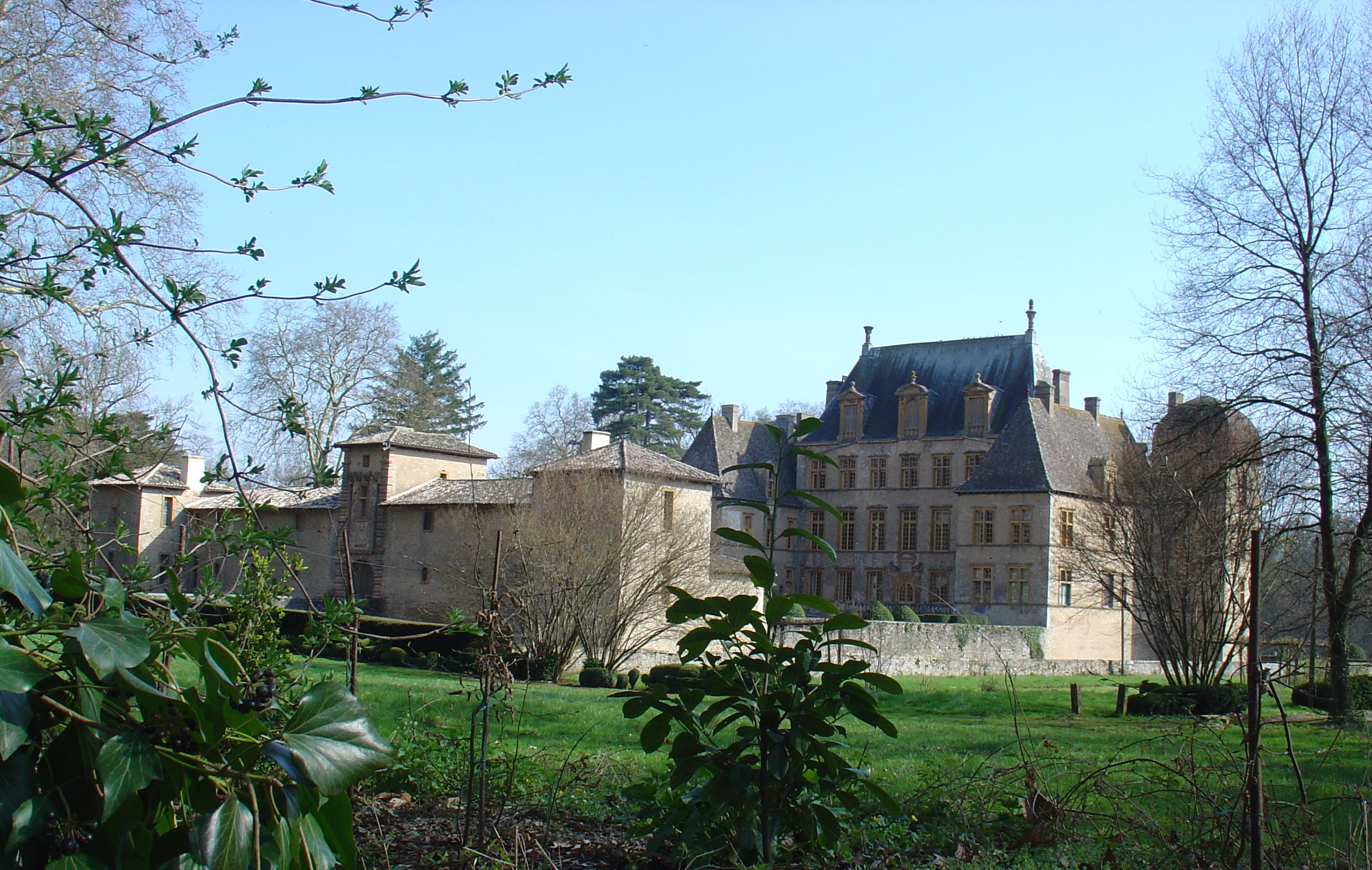
- Chateau of Fléchères
- Location of Fareins
- Location within France Location within Auvergne-Rhône-Alpes
- Coordinates: 46°01′13″N 4°45′44″E
- Country: France
- Region: Auvergne-Rhône-Alpes
- Department: Ain
- Arrondissement: Bourg-en-Bresse
- Canton: Villars-les-Dombes

Government
  - Mayor (2026–32): Yves Dumoulin
- Area^{1}: 8.22 km^{2} (3.17 sq mi)
- Elevation: 210 m (690 ft)
- Highest elevation: 253 m (830 ft)
- Lowest elevation: 167 m (548 ft)
- Population (2023): 2,533
  - Density: 308/km^{2} (798/sq mi)
- Time zone: UTC+01:00 (CET)
  - Summer (DST): UTC+02:00 (CEST)
- INSEE/Postal code: 01157 /01480
- ^{1} French Land Register data, which excludes lakes, ponds, glaciers > 1 km^{2} (0.386 sq mi or 247 acres) and river estuaries.

Fareins (French pronunciation: [faʁɛ̃]) is a commune in the Ain department in eastern France.

== Population ==
Historical population
Year	Pop.	±% p.a.
1968	871	—
1975	1,006	+2.08%
1982	1,385	+4.67%
1990	1,545	+1.38%
1999	1,684	+0.96%
2007	1,948	+1.84%
2012	2,196	+2.43%
2017	2,204	+0.07%
2023	2,533	+2.35%
Source: INSEE

== See also ==
- Communes of the Ain department
