= Canton of Villars-les-Dombes =

Coordinates: 46°00′05″N 5°01′46″E

Villars-les-Dombes
- Canton
- Interactive map of Villars-les-Dombes
- Country: France
- Region: Auvergne-Rhône-Alpes
- Department: Ain
- No. of communes: {{{nbcomm}}}
- Area: 390.44 km^{2} (150.75 sq mi)
- Population (2023): 35,798
  - Density: 91.686/km^{2} (237.47/sq mi)
- INSEE code: 01 22

The canton of Villars-les-Dombes is an administrative division in eastern France. At the French canton reorganisation which came into effect in March 2015, the canton was expanded from 10 to 25 communes:

1. Ambérieux-en-Dombes
2. Ars-sur-Formans
3. Baneins
4. Birieux
5. Bouligneux
6. Chaleins
7. Chaneins
8. Civrieux
9. Fareins
10. Francheleins
11. Lapeyrouse
12. Lurcy
13. Messimy-sur-Saône
14. Mionnay
15. Monthieux
16. Rancé
17. Relevant
18. Saint-André-de-Corcy
19. Sainte-Olive
20. Saint-Jean-de-Thurigneux
21. Saint-Marcel
22. Saint-Trivier-sur-Moignans
23. Savigneux
24. Villars-les-Dombes
25. Villeneuve

== Demographics ==
Historical population
| Year | Pop. | ±% p.a. |
|---|---|---|
| 2013 | 31,495 | — |
| 2018 | 33,511 | +1.25% |
Source: INSEE

== See also ==
- Cantons of the Ain department
- Communes of France
