= Villeneuve, Ain =

Commune in Auvergne-Rhône-Alpes, France

Villeneuve
- Commune
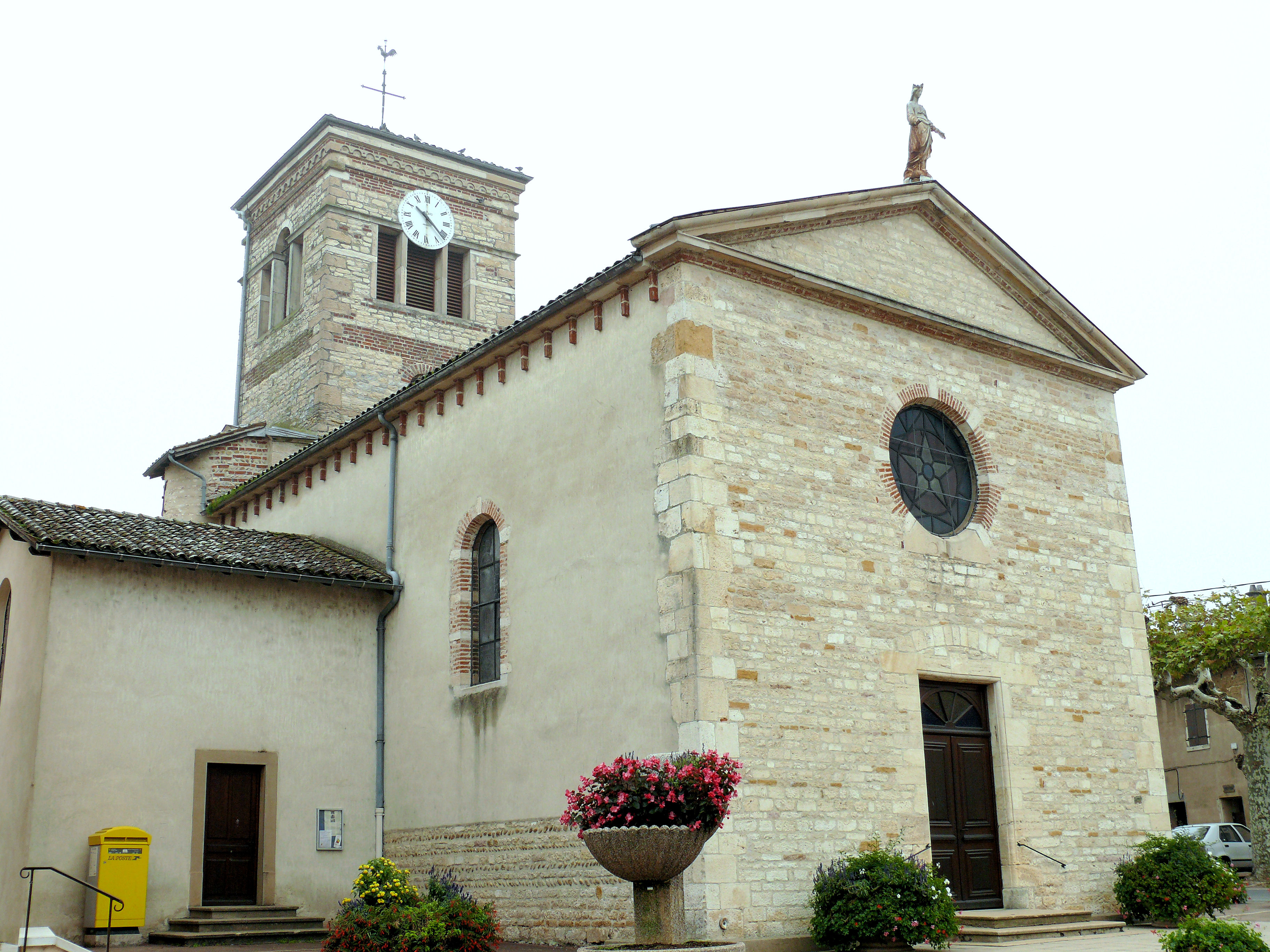

- Coat of arms
- Location of Villeneuve
- Location within France Location within Auvergne-Rhône-Alpes
- Coordinates: 46°01′19″N 4°50′15″E
- Country: France
- Region: Auvergne-Rhône-Alpes
- Department: Ain
- Arrondissement: Bourg-en-Bresse
- Canton: Villars-les-Dombes
- Intercommunality: Dombes-Saône-Vallée

Government
  - Mayor (2026–32): David Pommier
- Area^{1}: 26.79 km^{2} (10.34 sq mi)
- Elevation: 264 m (866 ft)
- Highest elevation: 287 m (942 ft)
- Lowest elevation: 230 m (750 ft)
- Population (2023): 1,638
  - Density: 61.14/km^{2} (158.4/sq mi)
- Time zone: UTC+01:00 (CET)
  - Summer (DST): UTC+02:00 (CEST)
- INSEE/Postal code: 01446 /01480
- ^{1} French Land Register data, which excludes lakes, ponds, glaciers > 1 km^{2} (0.386 sq mi or 247 acres) and river estuaries.

Villeneuve (French pronunciation: [vilnœv]; Arpitan: Velanôva) is a commune in the Ain department in eastern France.

== Population ==
Historical population
Year	Pop.	±% p.a.
1968	689	—
1975	630	−1.27%
1982	733	+2.19%
1990	845	+1.79%
1999	939	+1.18%
2007	1,306	+4.21%
2012	1,408	+1.52%
2017	1,501	+1.29%
2023	1,638	+1.47%
Source: INSEE

== See also ==
- Communes of the Ain department
