= Chaleins =

Commune in Auvergne-Rhône-Alpes, France

- Commune
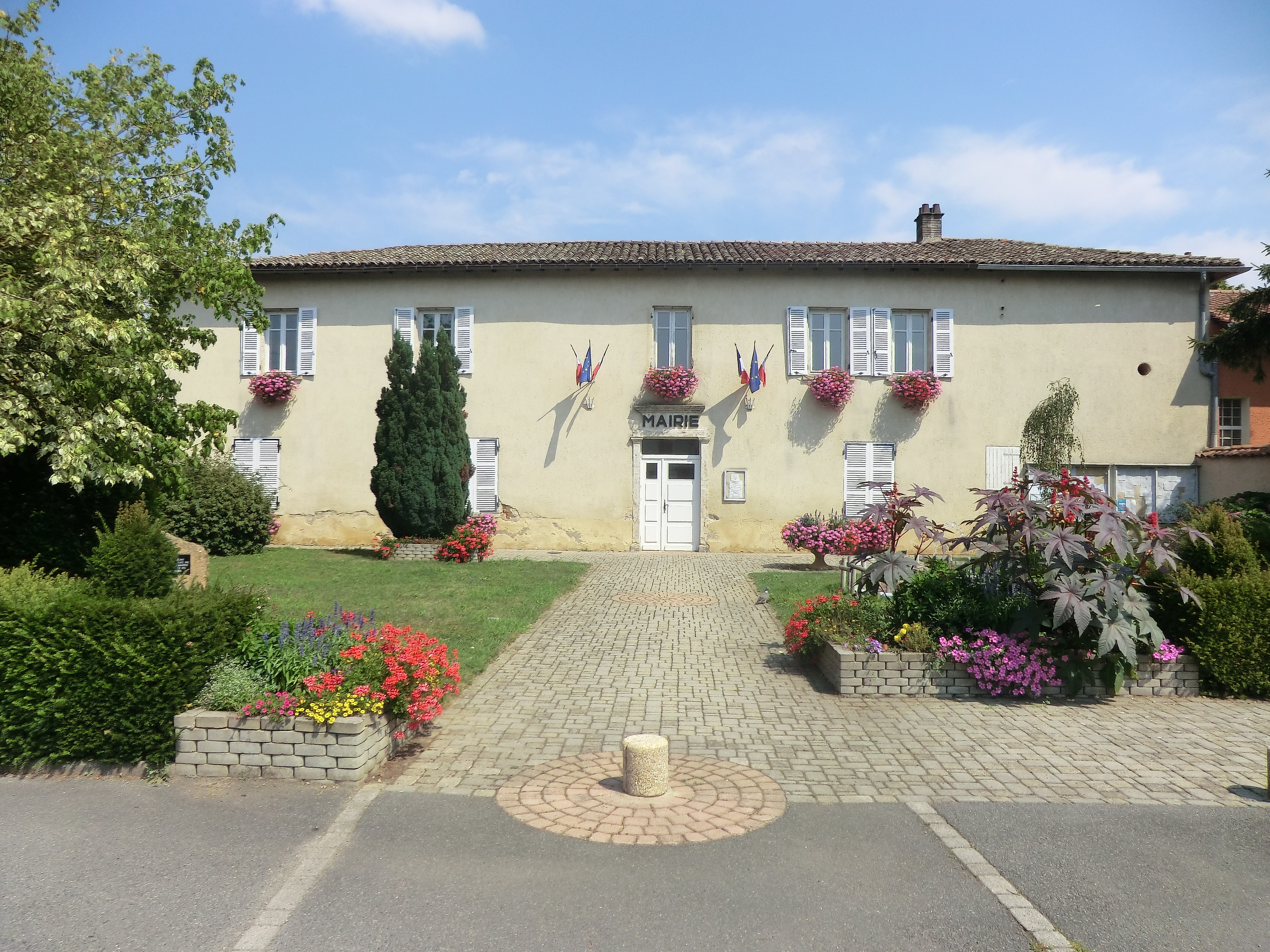
- Town hall

- Coat of arms
- Location of Chaleins
- Location within France Location within Auvergne-Rhône-Alpes
- Coordinates: 46°01′53″N 4°48′19″E
- Country: France
- Region: Auvergne-Rhône-Alpes
- Department: Ain
- Arrondissement: Bourg-en-Bresse
- Canton: Villars-les-Dombes
- Intercommunality: Val de Saône Centre

Government
  - Mayor (2026–32): Lucien Molines
- Area^{1}: 17 km^{2} (6.6 sq mi)
- Elevation: 238 m (781 ft)
- Highest elevation: 267 m (876 ft)
- Lowest elevation: 193 m (633 ft)
- Population (2023): 1,505
  - Density: 89/km^{2} (230/sq mi)
- Time zone: UTC+01:00 (CET)
  - Summer (DST): UTC+02:00 (CEST)
- INSEE/Postal code: 01075 /01480
- ^{1} French Land Register data, which excludes lakes, ponds, glaciers > 1 km^{2} (0.386 sq mi or 247 acres) and river estuaries.

Chaleins is a commune in the Ain department in eastern France.

== History ==
The already known parish with the eleventh century depended on the rich person and powerful metropolitan chapter on Lyon which shared the capacity on Chaleins with various seigneuriales families, of which the Palatin family with the thirteenth century.

When the duke of Maine was a governor of Dombes in 1725, it gave up for 6,000 pounds its rights of justice on the grounds of Chaleins to Daniel Viste de Brindas.

In 1820, the borough of Chaleins had only ten houses which surrounded the church. The remainder of the population was disseminated in the hamlets. One still finds on the place of the houses in eye of ox dating from the eighteenth century. The old rectory was transformed into town hall in 1989; one can admire a pretty water jet there.

A river, Matre, crosses the village. Taking its source in Villeneuve and flowing in the Saône with Messimy, it supplied formerly 3 mills whose last one ceased its activities in 1950. It is a river with trout. While following his course, one can appreciate reserves of the cascades which supplied the mills.

== Population ==
Historical population
Year	Pop.	±% p.a.
1968	461	—
1975	428	−1.06%
1982	594	+4.79%
1990	754	+3.03%
1999	1,025	+3.47%
2007	1,191	+1.89%
2012	1,160	−0.53%
2017	1,342	+2.96%
2023	1,505	+1.93%
Source: INSEE

== See also ==
- Communes of the Ain department
