= Monthieux =

Commune in Auvergne-Rhône-Alpes, France

Monthieux Montiœx (Arpitan)
- Commune
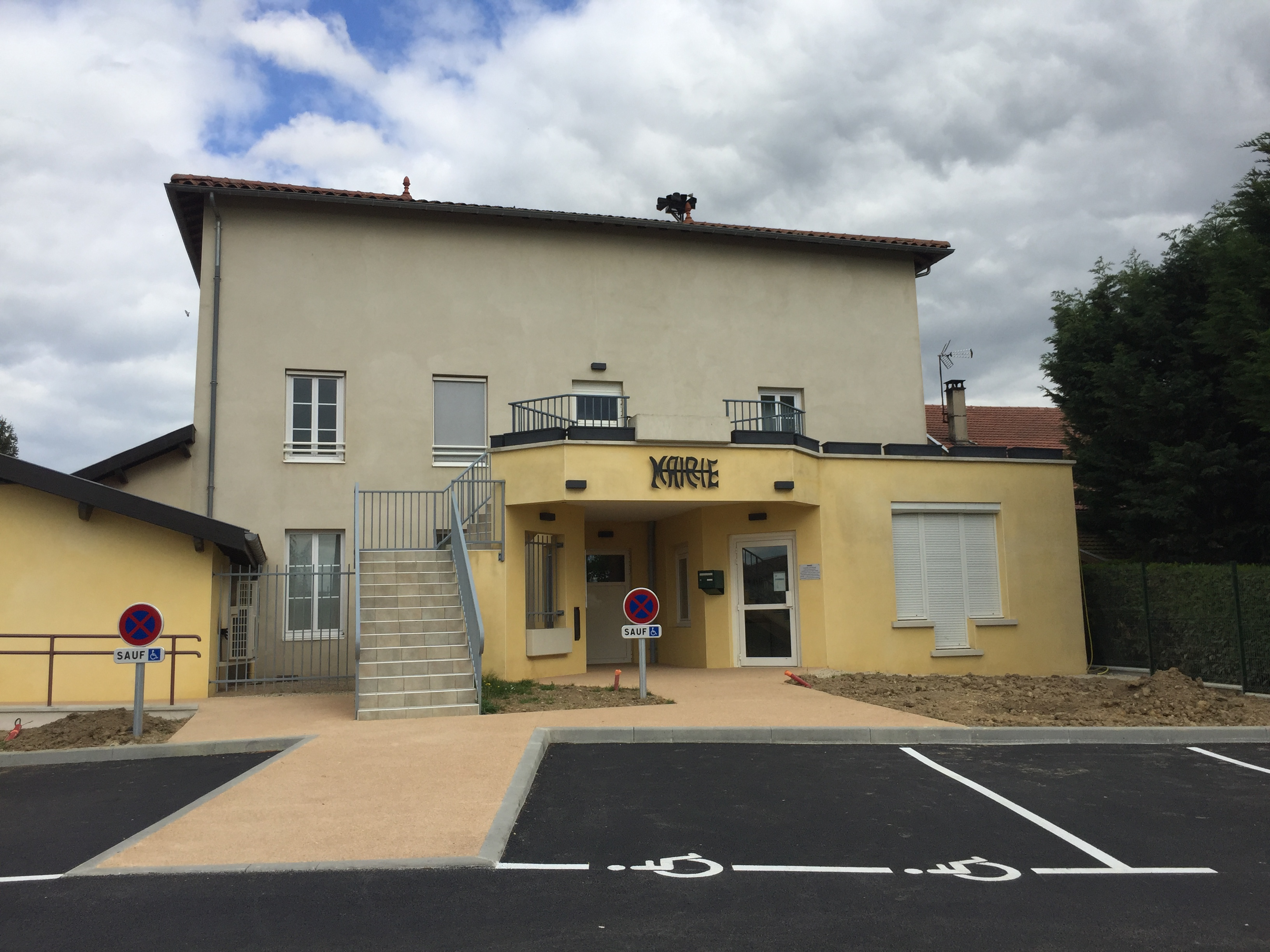
- Town hall
- Location of Monthieux
- Location within France Location within Auvergne-Rhône-Alpes
- Coordinates: 45°57′28″N 4°56′28″E
- Country: France
- Region: Auvergne-Rhône-Alpes
- Department: Ain
- Arrondissement: Bourg-en-Bresse
- Canton: Villars-les-Dombes
- Intercommunality: Dombes

Government
  - Mayor (2026–32): Philippe Paillasson
- Area^{1}: 10.75 km^{2} (4.15 sq mi)
- Elevation: 305 m (1,001 ft)
- Highest elevation: 311 m (1,020 ft)
- Lowest elevation: 281 m (922 ft)
- Population (2023): 664
  - Density: 61.8/km^{2} (160/sq mi)
- Time zone: UTC+01:00 (CET)
  - Summer (DST): UTC+02:00 (CEST)
- INSEE/Postal code: 01261 /01390
- ^{1} French Land Register data, which excludes lakes, ponds, glaciers > 1 km^{2} (0.386 sq mi or 247 acres) and river estuaries.

Monthieux (French pronunciation: [mɔ̃tjø]; Arpitan: Montiœx [mõ.ˈtjy]) is a commune in the Ain department in eastern France.

== Population ==
Historical population
Year	Pop.	±% p.a.
1968	194	—
1975	217	+1.61%
1982	247	+1.87%
1990	344	+4.23%
1999	578	+5.94%
2007	593	+0.32%
2012	646	+1.73%
2017	646	+0.00%
2023	664	+0.46%
Source: INSEE

== See also ==
- Communes of the Ain department
- Dombes
