= Saint-Jean-de-Thurigneux =

Commune in Auvergne-Rhône-Alpes, France

- Commune
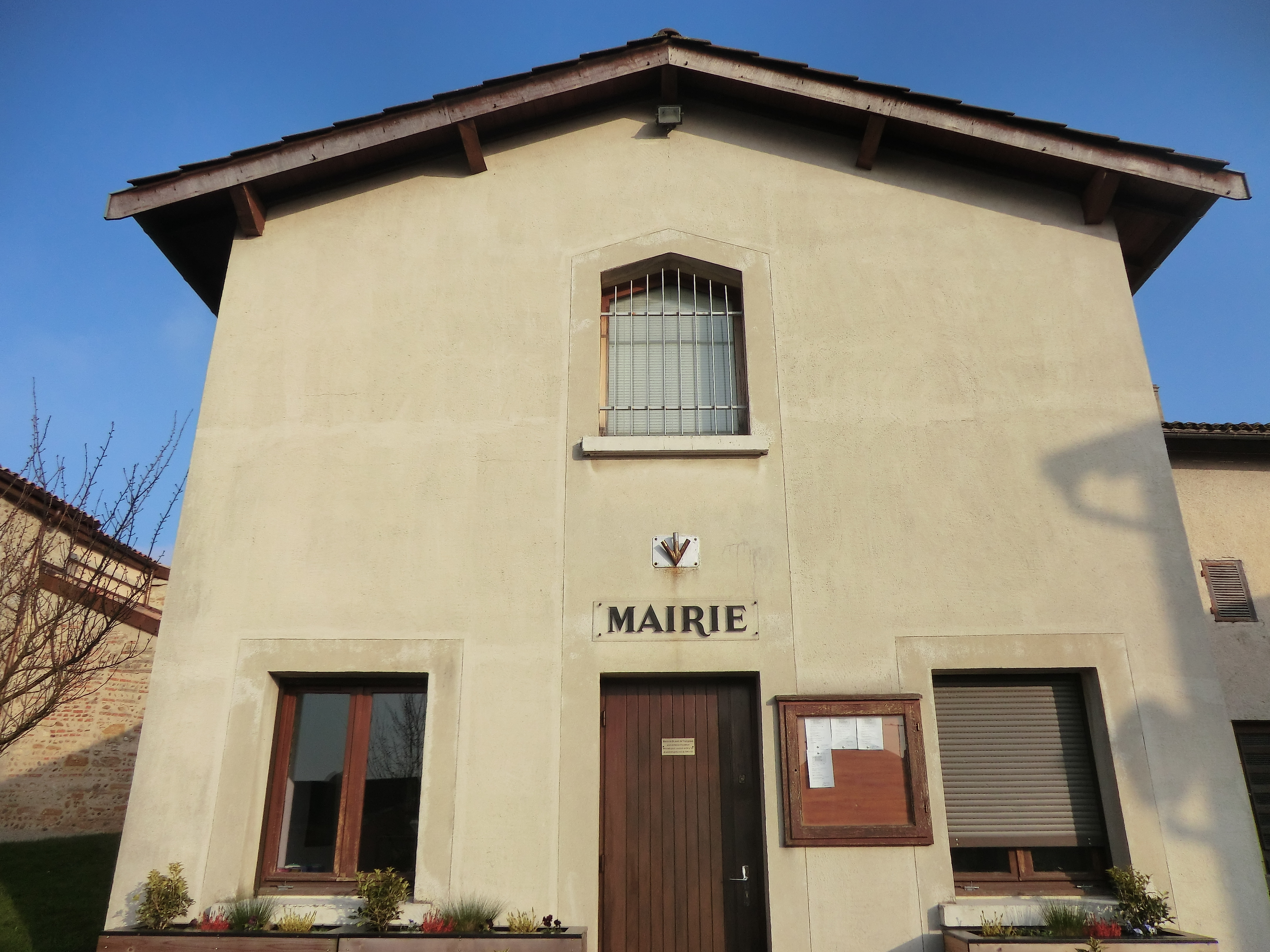
- Town hall
- Location of Saint-Jean-de-Thurigneux
- Location within France Location within Auvergne-Rhône-Alpes
- Coordinates: 45°57′11″N 4°52′59″E
- Country: France
- Region: Auvergne-Rhône-Alpes
- Department: Ain
- Arrondissement: Bourg-en-Bresse
- Canton: Villars-les-Dombes
- Intercommunality: Dombes Saône Vallée

Government
  - Mayor (2026–32): Stéphane Berthomieu
- Area^{1}: 16 km^{2} (6.2 sq mi)
- Elevation: 286 m (938 ft)
- Highest elevation: 305 m (1,001 ft)
- Lowest elevation: 265 m (869 ft)
- Population (2023): 863
  - Density: 54/km^{2} (140/sq mi)
- Time zone: UTC+01:00 (CET)
  - Summer (DST): UTC+02:00 (CEST)
- INSEE/Postal code: 01362 /01390
- ^{1} French Land Register data, which excludes lakes, ponds, glaciers > 1 km^{2} (0.386 sq mi or 247 acres) and river estuaries.

Saint-Jean-de-Thurigneux (French pronunciation: [sɛ̃ ʒɑ̃ də tyʁiɲø]; Arpitan: Sent-Jian-de-Toregniô) is a commune in the Ain department in eastern France.

== Population ==
Historical population
Year	Pop.	±% p.a.
1968	240	—
1975	273	+1.86%
1982	329	+2.70%
1990	504	+5.48%
1999	554	+1.06%
2007	586	+0.70%
2012	774	+5.72%
2017	771	−0.08%
2023	863	+1.90%
Source: INSEE

== See also ==
- Communes of the Ain department
