= Messimy-sur-Saône =

Commune in Auvergne-Rhône-Alpes, France

- Commune
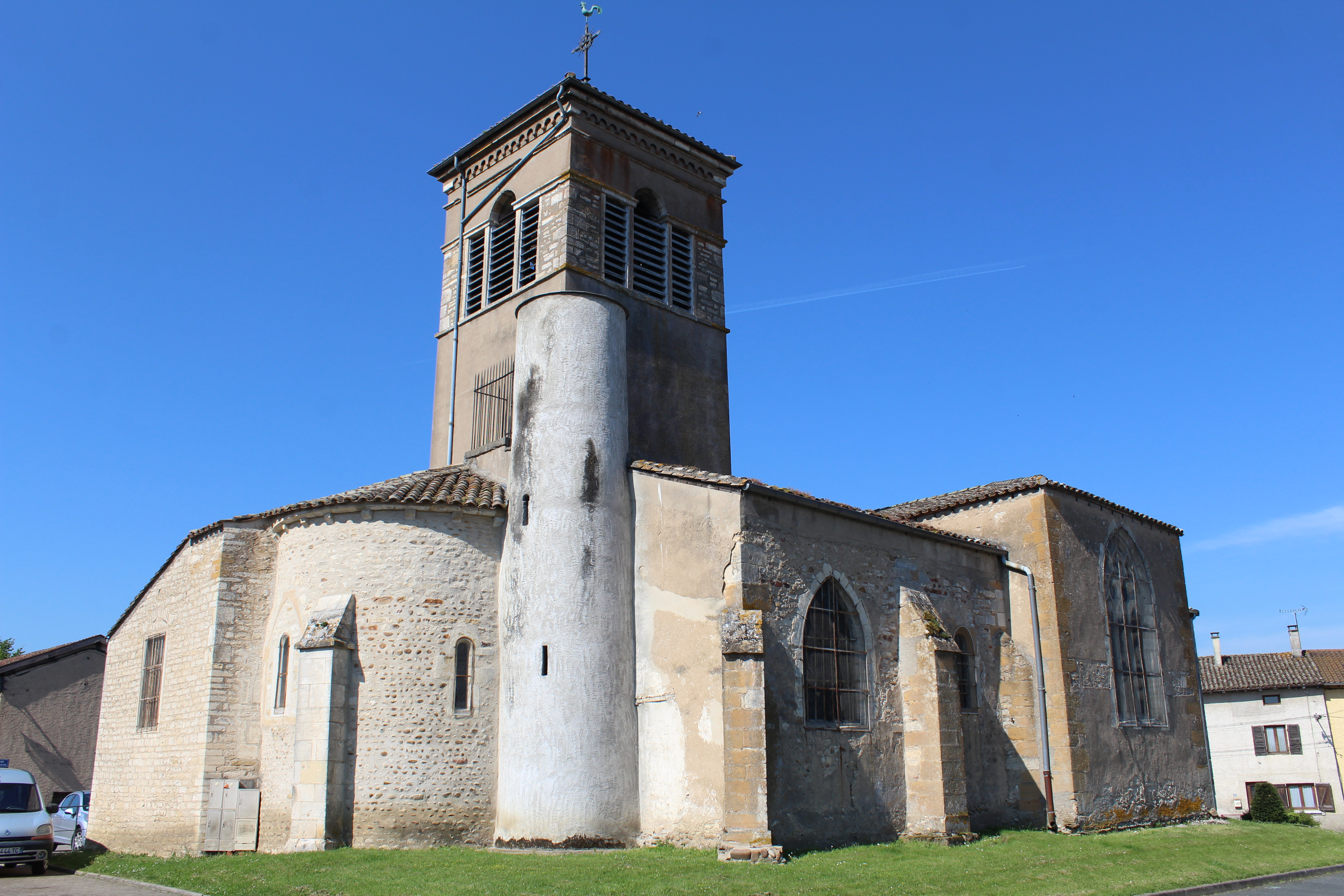
- Location of Messimy-sur-Saône
- Location within France Location within Auvergne-Rhône-Alpes
- Coordinates: 46°02′57″N 4°45′55″E
- Country: France
- Region: Auvergne-Rhône-Alpes
- Department: Ain
- Arrondissement: Bourg-en-Bresse
- Canton: Villars-les-Dombes

Government
  - Mayor (2026–32): Christian Beguet
- Area^{1}: 5.95 km^{2} (2.30 sq mi)
- Elevation: 210 m (690 ft)
- Highest elevation: 226 m (741 ft)
- Lowest elevation: 168 m (551 ft)
- Population (2023): 1,338
  - Density: 225/km^{2} (582/sq mi)
- Time zone: UTC+01:00 (CET)
  - Summer (DST): UTC+02:00 (CEST)
- INSEE/Postal code: 01243 /01480
- ^{1} French Land Register data, which excludes lakes, ponds, glaciers > 1 km^{2} (0.386 sq mi or 247 acres) and river estuaries.

Messimy-sur-Saône (French pronunciation: [mɛsimi syʁ son], literally Messimy on Saône) is a commune in the Ain department in eastern France.

== Population ==
Historical population
Year	Pop.	±% p.a.
1968	346	—
1975	401	+2.13%
1982	619	+6.40%
1990	827	+3.69%
1999	931	+1.32%
2007	1,131	+2.46%
2012	1,213	+1.41%
2017	1,224	+0.18%
2023	1,338	+1.50%
Source: INSEE

== See also ==
- Communes of the Ain department
