= Lurcy =

Commune in Auvergne-Rhône-Alpes, France

- Commune
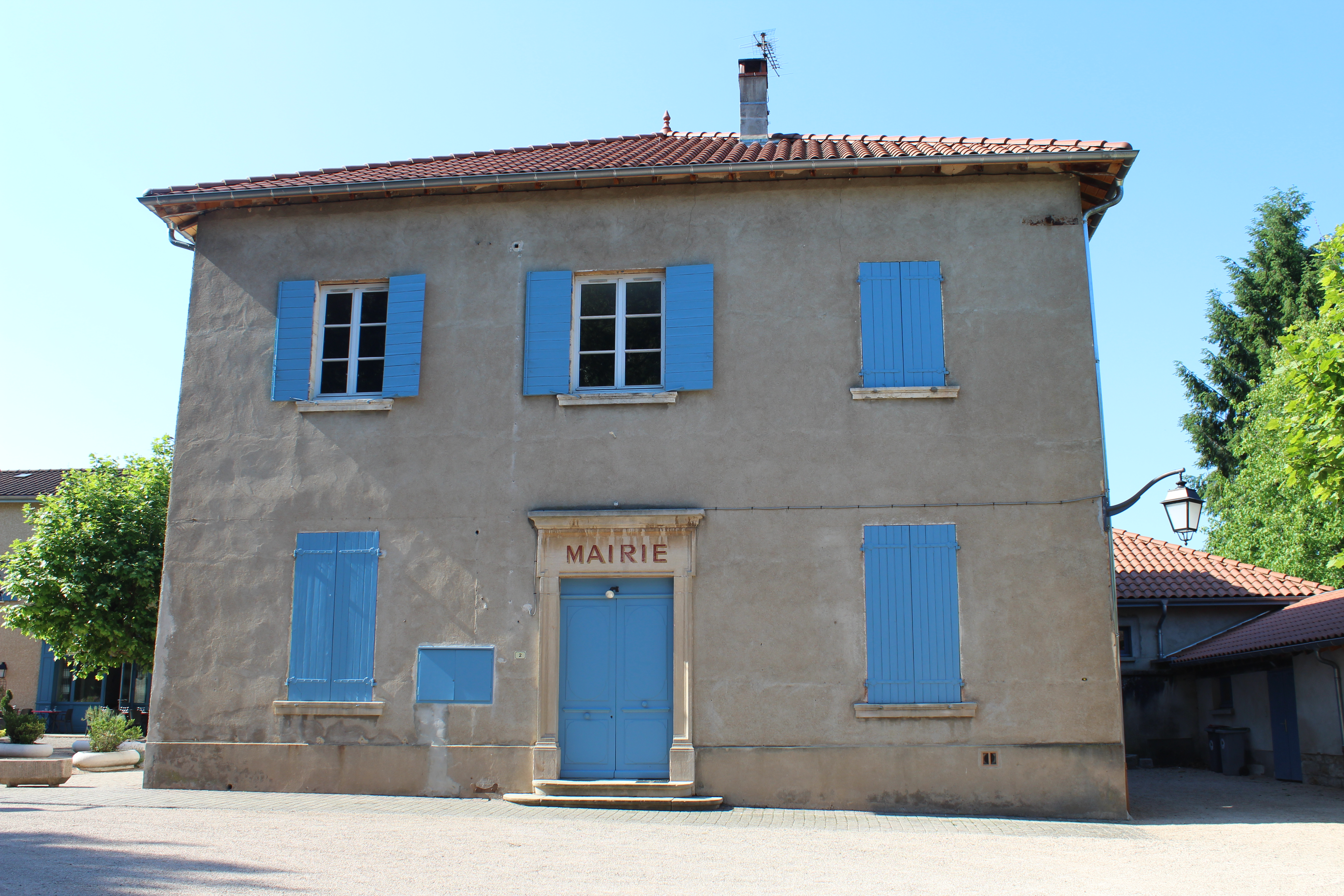
- Town hall
- Location of Lurcy
- Location within France Location within Auvergne-Rhône-Alpes
- Coordinates: 46°04′00″N 4°46′00″E
- Country: France
- Region: Auvergne-Rhône-Alpes
- Department: Ain
- Arrondissement: Bourg-en-Bresse
- Canton: Villars-les-Dombes
- Intercommunality: Val de Saône Centre

Government
  - Mayor (2026–32): Nathalie Bisignano
- Area^{1}: 4.81 km^{2} (1.86 sq mi)
- Elevation: 216 m (709 ft)
- Highest elevation: 233 m (764 ft)
- Lowest elevation: 169 m (554 ft)
- Population (2023): 406
  - Density: 84.4/km^{2} (219/sq mi)
- Time zone: UTC+01:00 (CET)
  - Summer (DST): UTC+02:00 (CEST)
- INSEE/Postal code: 01225 /01090
- ^{1} French Land Register data, which excludes lakes, ponds, glaciers > 1 km^{2} (0.386 sq mi or 247 acres) and river estuaries.

Lurcy (French pronunciation: [lyʁsi]) is a commune in the Ain department in eastern France.

== Population ==
Historical population
Year	Pop.	±% p.a.
1968	194	—
1975	182	−0.91%
1982	197	+1.14%
1990	199	+0.13%
1999	257	+2.88%
2007	388	+5.28%
2012	394	+0.31%
2017	384	−0.51%
2023	406	+0.93%
Source: INSEE

== See also ==
- Communes of the Ain department
