= Lapeyrouse, Ain =

Commune in Auvergne-Rhône-Alpes, France

Lapeyrouse
- Commune
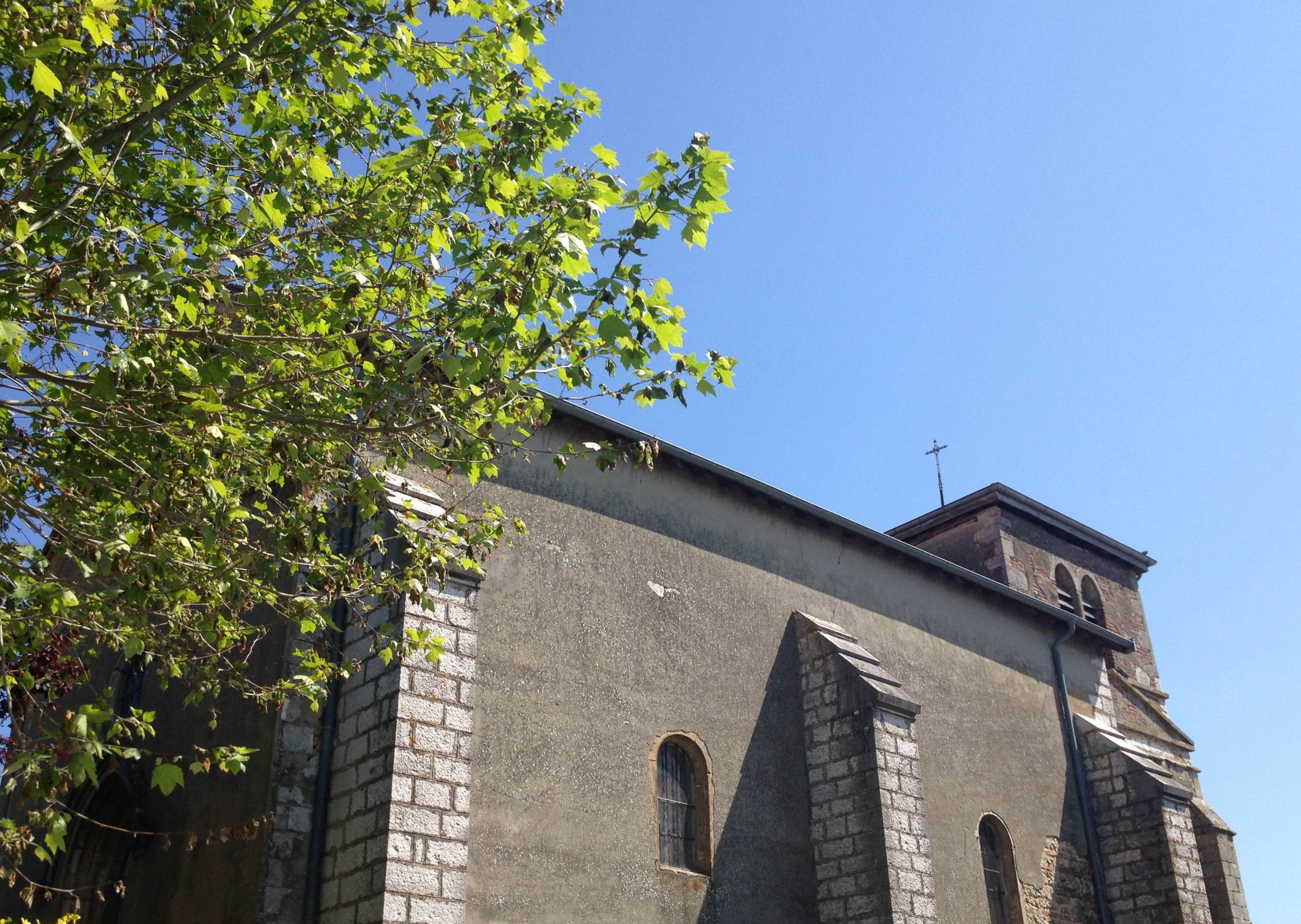
- Location of Lapeyrouse
- Location within France Location within Auvergne-Rhône-Alpes
- Coordinates: 45°59′02″N 4°58′39″E
- Country: France
- Region: Auvergne-Rhône-Alpes
- Department: Ain
- Arrondissement: Bourg-en-Bresse
- Canton: Villars-les-Dombes

Government
  - Mayor (2026–32): Rémy Dubost
- Area^{1}: 20.04 km^{2} (7.74 sq mi)
- Elevation: 293 m (961 ft)
- Highest elevation: 295 m (968 ft)
- Lowest elevation: 277 m (909 ft)
- Population (2023): 348
  - Density: 17.4/km^{2} (45.0/sq mi)
- Time zone: UTC+01:00 (CET)
  - Summer (DST): UTC+02:00 (CEST)
- INSEE/Postal code: 01207 /01330
- ^{1} French Land Register data, which excludes lakes, ponds, glaciers > 1 km^{2} (0.386 sq mi or 247 acres) and river estuaries.

Lapeyrouse (French pronunciation: [lapeʁuz]) is a commune in the Ain department in eastern France.

== Geography ==
The village lies in the middle of the commune, which counts numerous ponds.

The Chalaronne has its source in the commune.

== Population ==
Historical population
| Year | Pop. | ±% p.a. |
|---|---|---|
| 1968 | 183 | — |
| 1975 | 169 | −1.13% |
| 1982 | 199 | +2.36% |
| 1990 | 207 | +0.49% |
| 1999 | 226 | +0.98% |
| 2007 | 295 | +3.39% |
| 2012 | 297 | +0.14% |
| 2017 | 316 | +1.25% |
| 2023 | 348 | +1.62% |
Source: INSEE

== See also ==
- Communes of the Ain department
- Dombes
