= Relevant, Ain =

Commune in Auvergne-Rhône-Alpes, France

Relevant
- Commune
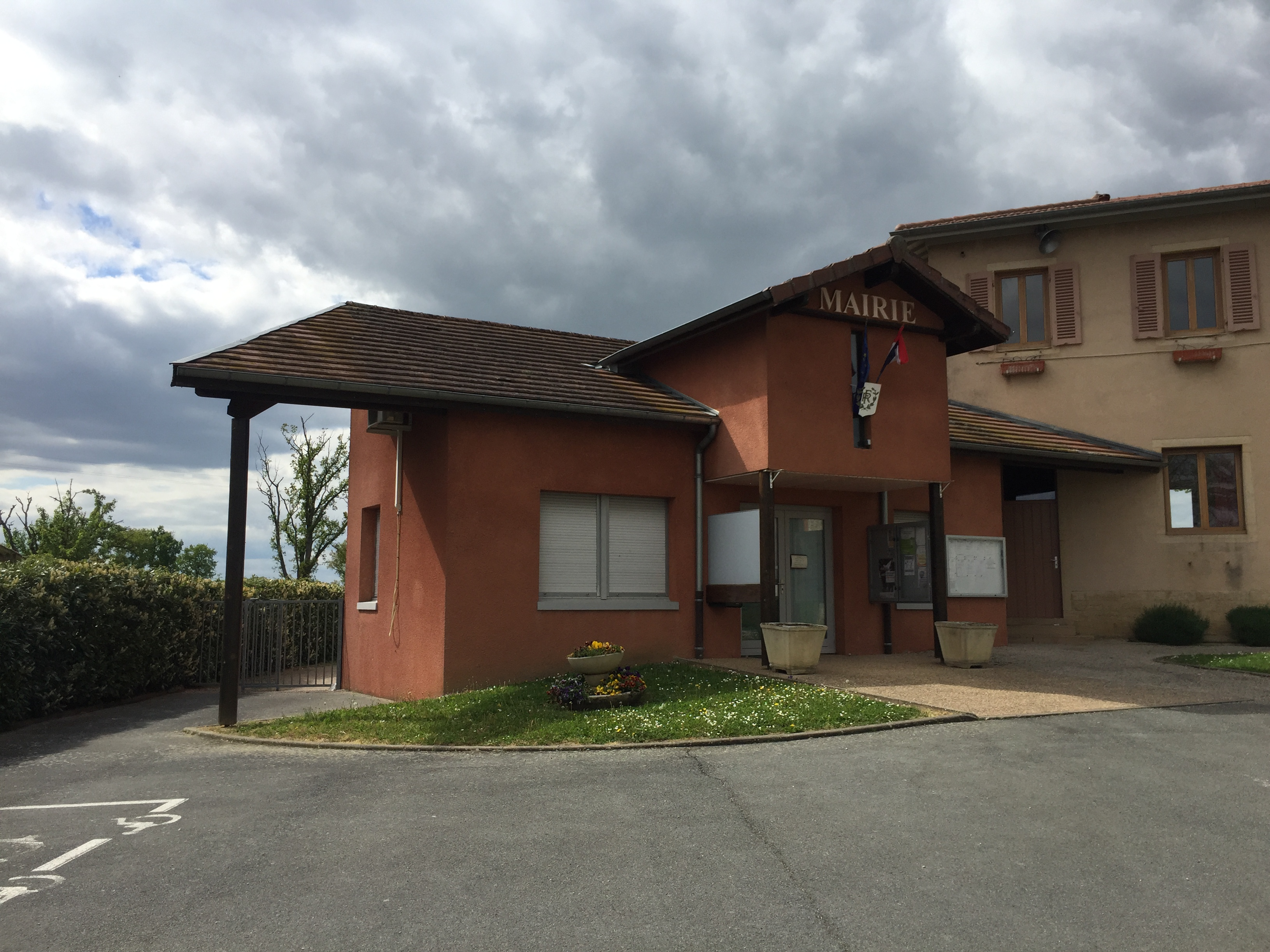
- Town hall
- Location of Relevant
- Location within France Location within Auvergne-Rhône-Alpes
- Coordinates: 46°05′28″N 4°57′00″E
- Country: France
- Region: Auvergne-Rhône-Alpes
- Department: Ain
- Arrondissement: Bourg-en-Bresse
- Canton: Villars-les-Dombes
- Intercommunality: Dombes

Government
  - Mayor (2026–32): Damien Ferrais-Damour
- Area^{1}: 12.38 km^{2} (4.78 sq mi)
- Elevation: 270 m (890 ft)
- Highest elevation: 282 m (925 ft)
- Lowest elevation: 235 m (771 ft)
- Population (2023): 465
  - Density: 37.6/km^{2} (97.3/sq mi)
- Time zone: UTC+01:00 (CET)
  - Summer (DST): UTC+02:00 (CEST)
- INSEE/Postal code: 01319 /01990
- ^{1} French Land Register data, which excludes lakes, ponds, glaciers > 1 km^{2} (0.386 sq mi or 247 acres) and river estuaries.

Relevant (French pronunciation: [ʁələvɑ̃]) is a commune in the Ain department in eastern France.

== Population ==
Historical population
Year	Pop.	±% p.a.
1968	254	—
1975	262	+0.44%
1982	331	+3.40%
1990	327	−0.15%
1999	367	+1.29%
2007	417	+1.61%
2012	474	+2.60%
2017	463	−0.47%
2023	465	+0.07%
Source: INSEE

== See also ==
- Communes of the Ain department
- Dombes
