= Savigneux, Ain =

Commune in Auvergne-Rhône-Alpes, France

Savigneux
- Commune
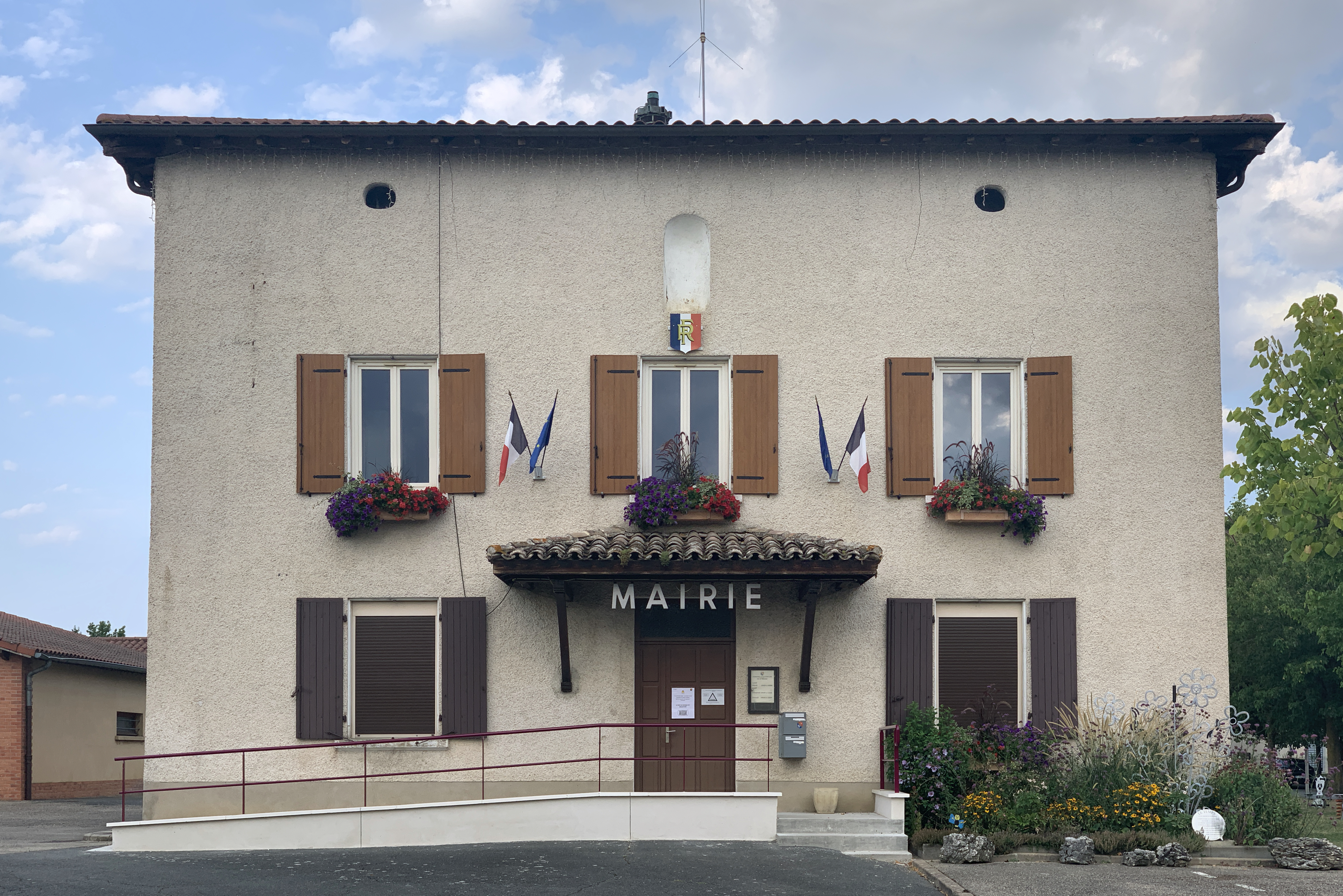
- City Hall of Savigneux

- Coat of arms
- Location of Savigneux
- Location within France Location within Auvergne-Rhône-Alpes
- Coordinates: 46°00′07″N 4°50′54″E
- Country: France
- Region: Auvergne-Rhône-Alpes
- Department: Ain
- Arrondissement: Bourg-en-Bresse
- Canton: Villars-les-Dombes
- Intercommunality: Dombes Saône Vallée

Government
  - Mayor (2026–32): Gilles Garnier
- Area^{1}: 14.75 km^{2} (5.70 sq mi)
- Elevation: 265 m (869 ft)
- Highest elevation: 287 m (942 ft)
- Lowest elevation: 237 m (778 ft)
- Population (2023): 1,469
  - Density: 99.59/km^{2} (257.9/sq mi)
- Time zone: UTC+01:00 (CET)
  - Summer (DST): UTC+02:00 (CEST)
- INSEE/Postal code: 01398 /01480
- ^{1} French Land Register data, which excludes lakes, ponds, glaciers > 1 km^{2} (0.386 sq mi or 247 acres) and river estuaries.

Savigneux (French pronunciation: [saviɲø]) is a commune in the Ain department in the Auvergne-Rhône-Alpes in eastern France.

== Culture and Heritage ==
- The Juis Castle, a castle of the 16th Century

== Administration ==
List of successive mayors

Term start	Term end	Name	Party	Position
1950	March 1971	Jean Chagneux		
March 1971	24 March 1989	Raymond Sanloup		
24 March 1989	14 March 2008	Paul Chagneux		
14 March 2008	28 May 2020	Daniel Vignard	Miscellaneous Right (MR)	Retired
28 May 2020	Incumbent	Gilles Garnier	Unaffiliated	

== Geography ==
The village is in the south-western part of the Ain department 35 km north of Lyon and 12 km east of Villefranche-sur-Saône in the heart of the Dombes region, which is known for its many lagoons. Savigneux is on the Dombes Plateau, while to the west it borders the fertile hills of the Val de Saône.

== Population and Society ==
Historical population
Year	Pop.	±% p.a.
1968	455	—
1975	449	−0.19%
1982	621	+4.74%
1990	792	+3.09%
1999	875	+1.11%
2007	1,169	+3.69%
2012	1,232	+1.06%
2017	1,351	+1.86%
2023	1,469	+1.41%
Source: INSEE

=== Sports ===
The Savigneux have a football field in the center of the city and 2 tennis courts: 1 in front of the school and 1 in the surroundings of the football field.

They have a football club, named FC SAVIGNEUX and a tennis club.

== See also ==
- Communes of the Ain department

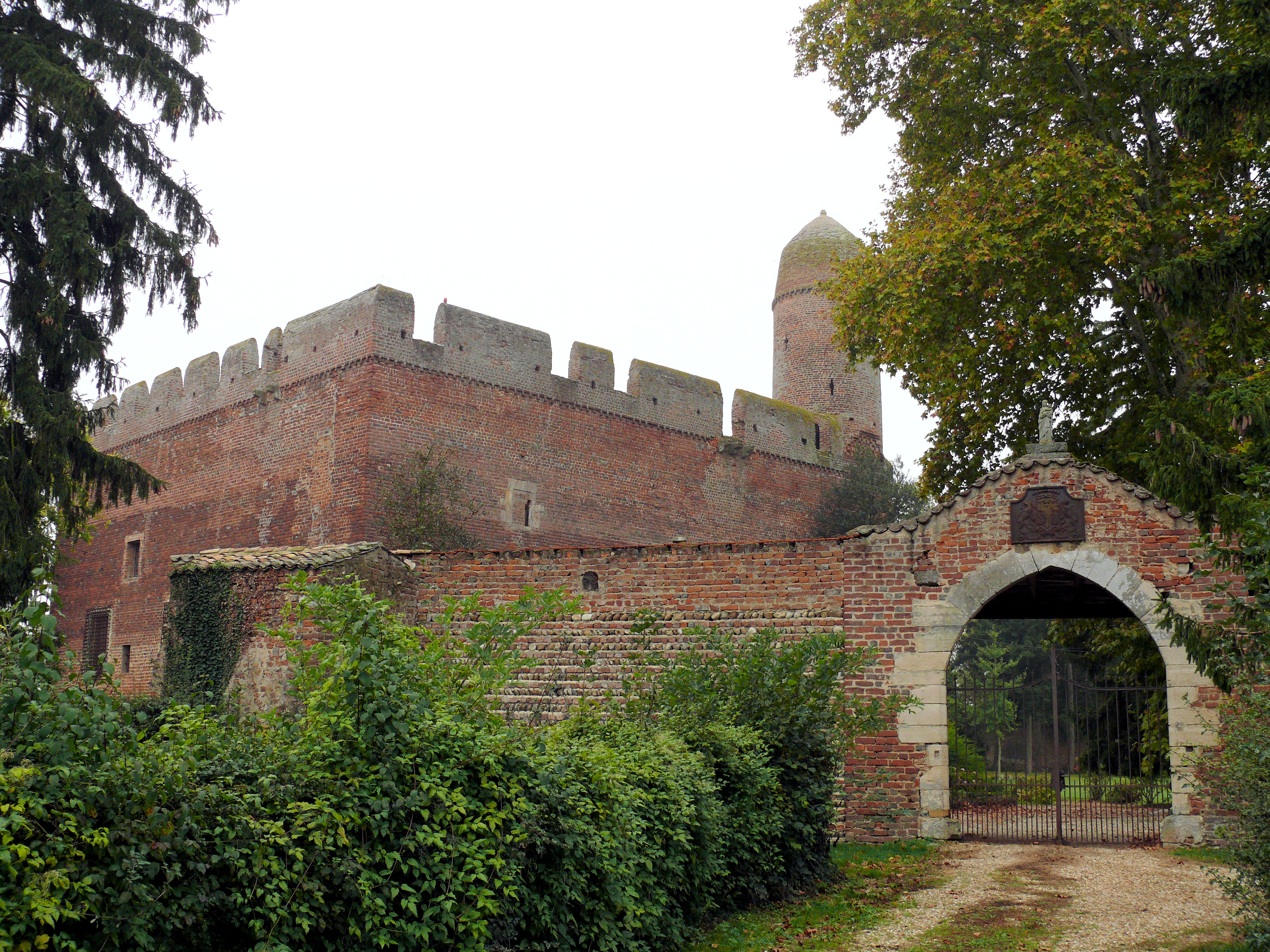
Juis Castle
