= Chaneins =

Commune in Auvergne-Rhône-Alpes, France

- Commune
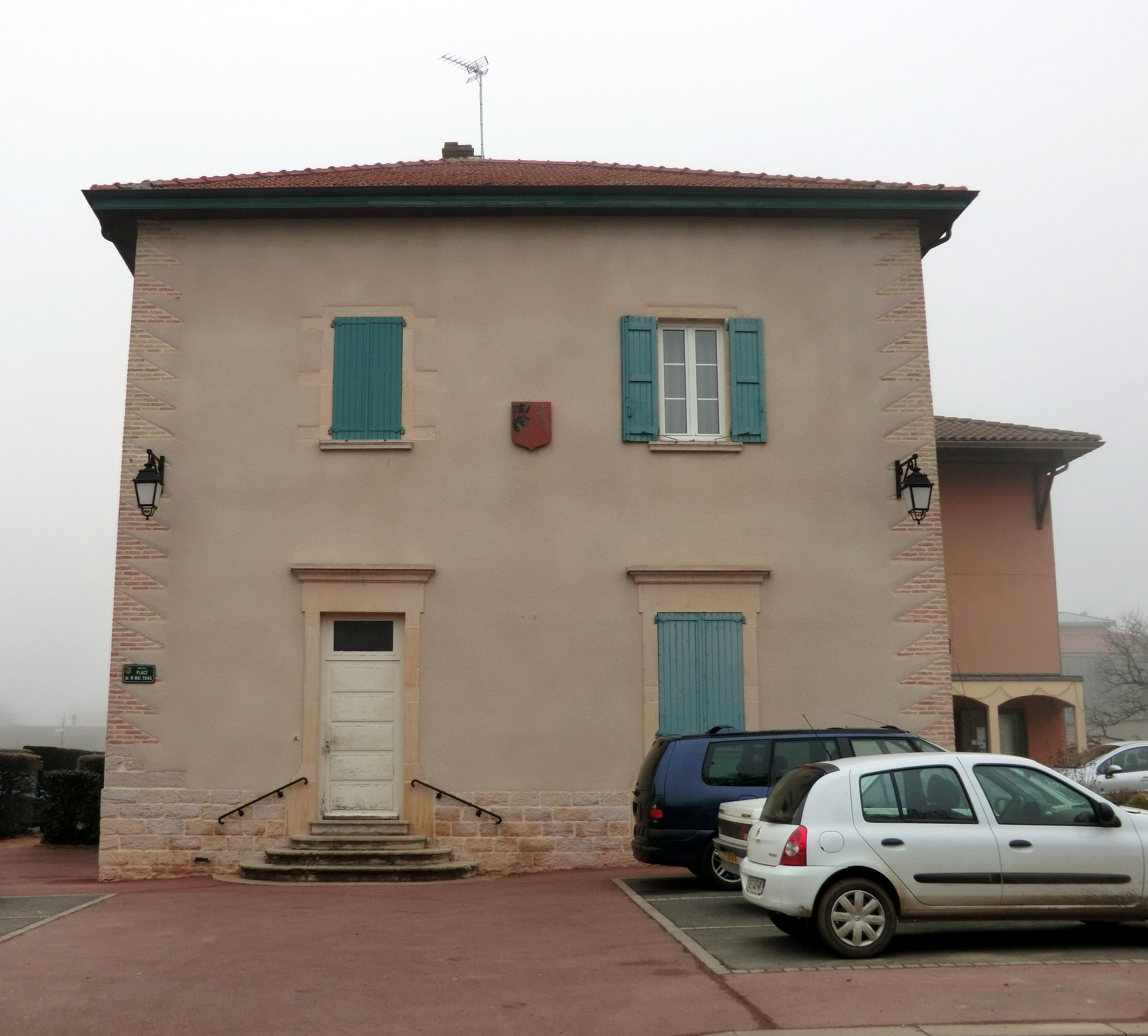
- Town hall

- Coat of arms
- Location of Chaneins
- Location within France Location within Auvergne-Rhône-Alpes
- Coordinates: 46°06′N 4°51′E
- Country: France
- Region: Auvergne-Rhône-Alpes
- Department: Ain
- Arrondissement: Bourg-en-Bresse
- Canton: Villars-les-Dombes
- Intercommunality: Dombes

Government
  - Mayor (2026–32): Jean-Michel Cormoreche
- Area^{1}: 12.63 km^{2} (4.88 sq mi)
- Elevation: 260 m (850 ft)
- Highest elevation: 283 m (928 ft)
- Lowest elevation: 206 m (676 ft)
- Population (2023): 1,046
  - Density: 82.82/km^{2} (214.5/sq mi)
- Time zone: UTC+01:00 (CET)
  - Summer (DST): UTC+02:00 (CEST)
- INSEE/Postal code: 01083 /01990
- ^{1} French Land Register data, which excludes lakes, ponds, glaciers > 1 km^{2} (0.386 sq mi or 247 acres) and river estuaries.

Chaneins (French pronunciation: [ʃanɛ̃]; Arpitan: Chanens) is a commune in the Ain department in eastern France.

== Population ==
Historical population
Year	Pop.	±% p.a.
1968	411	—
1975	376	−1.26%
1982	420	+1.59%
1990	478	+1.63%
1999	560	+1.77%
2007	842	+5.23%
2012	817	−0.60%
2017	910	+2.18%
2023	1,046	+2.35%
Source: INSEE

== See also ==
- Communes of the Ain department
