= Saint-Trivier-sur-Moignans =

Commune in Auvergne-Rhône-Alpes, France

- Commune
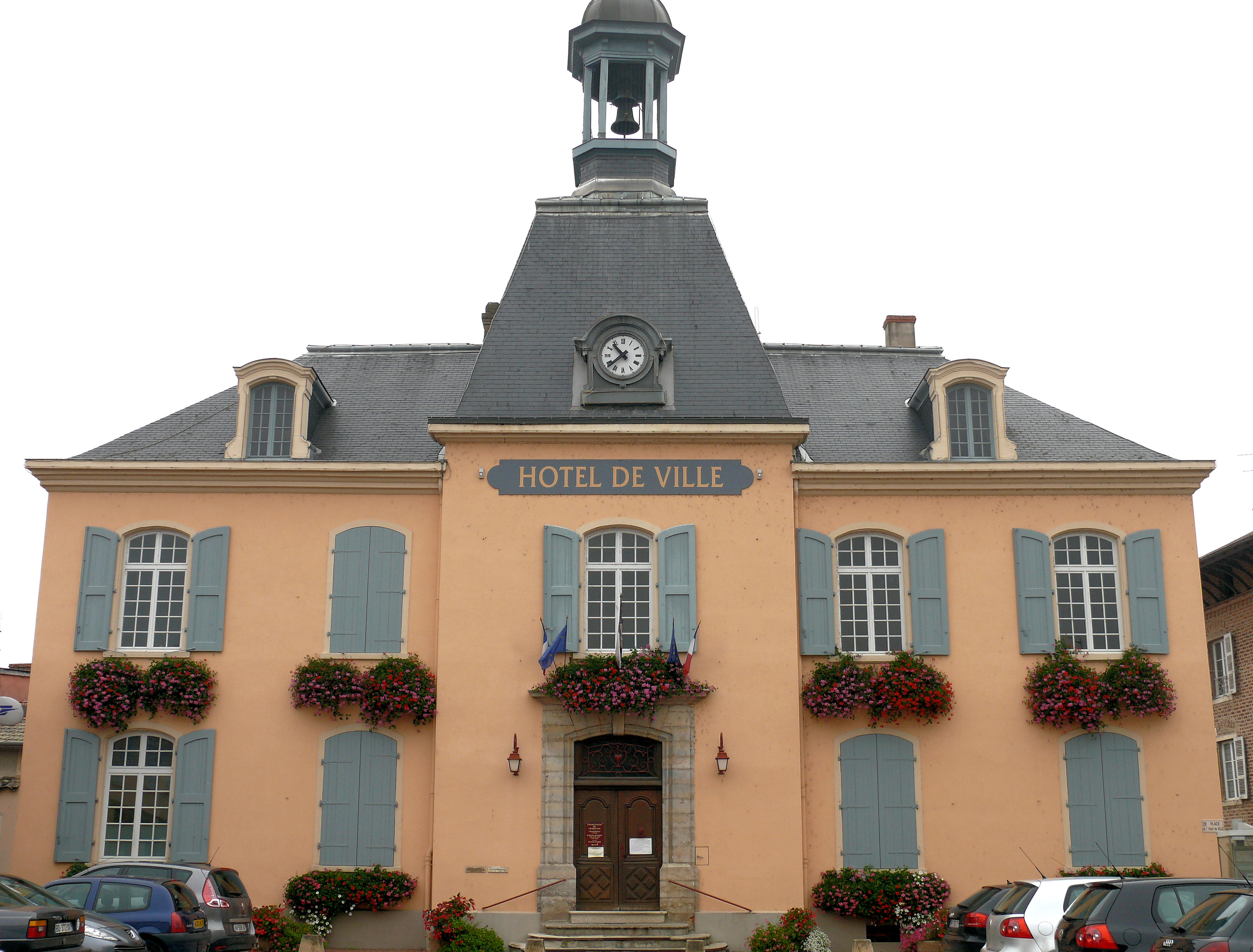
- Town hall

- Coat of arms
- Location of Saint-Trivier-sur-Moignans
- Location within France Location within Auvergne-Rhône-Alpes
- Coordinates: 46°04′00″N 4°54′00″E
- Country: France
- Region: Auvergne-Rhône-Alpes
- Department: Ain
- Arrondissement: Bourg-en-Bresse
- Canton: Villars-les-Dombes
- Intercommunality: Dombes

Government
  - Mayor (2026–32): Chrystèle Cuenca
- Area^{1}: 41.99 km^{2} (16.21 sq mi)
- Elevation: 255 m (837 ft)
- Highest elevation: 289 m (948 ft)
- Lowest elevation: 230 m (750 ft)
- Population (2023): 1,963
  - Density: 46.75/km^{2} (121.1/sq mi)
- Time zone: UTC+01:00 (CET)
  - Summer (DST): UTC+02:00 (CEST)
- INSEE/Postal code: 01389 /01990
- ^{1} French Land Register data, which excludes lakes, ponds, glaciers > 1 km^{2} (0.386 sq mi or 247 acres) and river estuaries.

Saint-Trivier-sur-Moignans (French pronunciation: [sɛ̃ tʁivje syʁ mwaɲɑ̃], lit. 'Saint Trivier on Moignans') is a commune in the Ain department in eastern France.

== Population ==
Historical population
Year	Pop.	±% p.a.
1968	1,140	—
1975	1,151	+0.14%
1982	1,233	+0.99%
1990	1,471	+2.23%
1999	1,537	+0.49%
2007	1,864	+2.44%
2012	1,817	−0.51%
2017	1,799	−0.20%
2023	1,963	+1.46%
Source: INSEE

== See also ==
- Communes of the Ain department
