= Canton of Montluel =

Coordinates: 45°51′07″N 5°03′28″E

Montluel
- Former canton
- Interactive map of Montluel
- Country: France
- Region: Auvergne-Rhône-Alpes
- Department: Ain
- No. of communes: {{{nbcomm}}}
- Disbanded: 2015
- Area: 127.49 km^{2} (49.22 sq mi)
- Population (2012): 23,713
  - Density: 186.00/km^{2} (481.73/sq mi)

The canton of Montluel is a former administrative division in eastern France. It was disbanded following the French canton reorganisation which came into effect in March 2015. It had 23,713 inhabitants (2012).

The canton comprised 9 communes:

- Balan
- Béligneux
- La Boisse
- Bressolles
- Dagneux
- Montluel
- Niévroz
- Pizay
- Sainte-Croix

== Demographics ==
Historical population Canton of Montluel
Year	1962	1968	1975	1982	1990	1999
Pop.	7,756	9,278	11,949	14,053	18,016	20,103
±%	—	+19.6%	+28.8%	+17.6%	+28.2%	+11.6%
From the year 1962 on: No double counting – residents of multiple communes (e.g. students and military personnel) are counted only once. Source: INSEE

== See also ==
- Cantons of the Ain department
