= Martin Dumollard =

French serial killer (1810–1862)

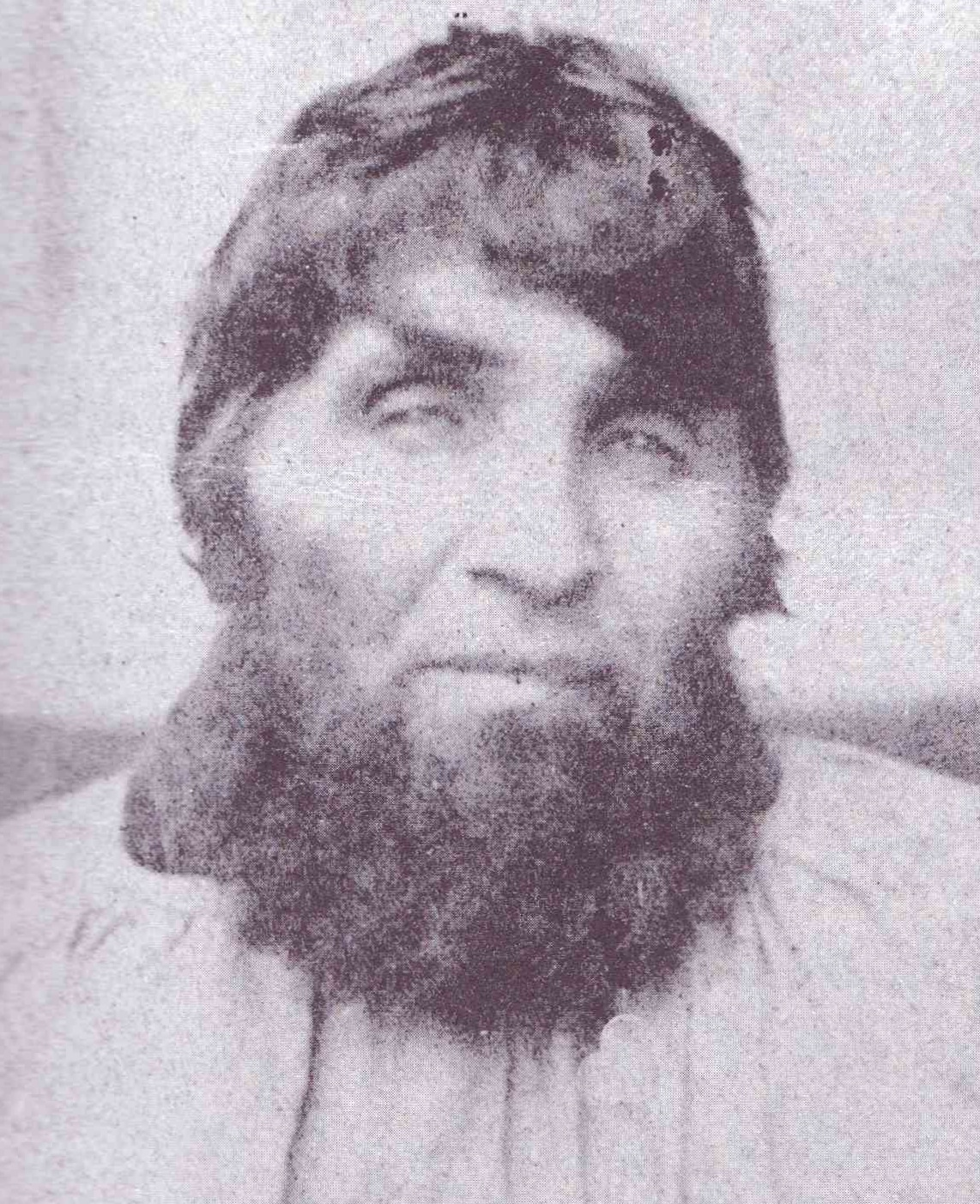
- Martin Dumollard in 1861.
- Born: June 22, 1810; Tramoyes, Ain, France
- Died: March 8, 1862 (aged 51); Montluel, Ain, France
- Cause of death: Guillotined
- Other names: "The Maid Killer"; Raymond
- Conviction: Murder
- Penalty: Death

Details
- Victims: 3-30
- Span of crimes: 1855–1861
- Country: France
- States: Ain, Lyon
- Date apprehended: June 2, 1861

Martin Dumollard (June 22, 1810 − March 8, 1862) was a French serial killer condemned to the guillotine after having been arrested and charged with the deaths of maids from 1855 to 1861. His victims were approached in Lyon by Dumollard, who offered them a nice house in Côtière. Convinced, they would eventually follow him and, during their wanderings on foot, he attacked them. All twelve assaults or attempted assaults occurred in the late 1850s and early 1860s until that of Marie Pichon on May 28, 1861. He was quickly arrested, along with his wife and accomplice, Marie-Anne Martinet, who stole the personal belongings and used them for resale. Their trial took place from January 29 to February 1, 1862: Dumollard was sentenced to death and his wife, twenty years of penal labour. This affair, which preceded that of Joseph Vacher by about thirty years, had a great repercussion in France; it is often considered one of the first cases of a serial killer in France. Dumollard is notably mentioned in Les Misérables by Victor Hugo.

== Biography ==
=== Youth ===
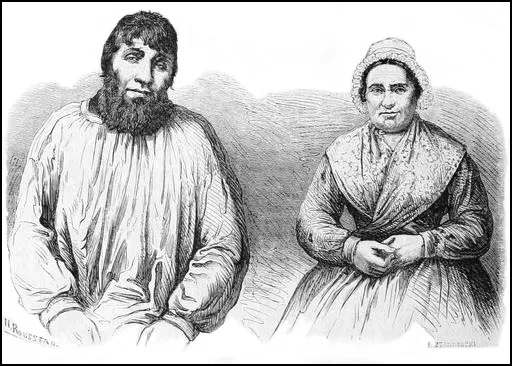
Representation of the Dumollard couple in 1864.

Martin Dumollard was the son of Marie-Josephte Rey and Pierre Dumollard. The latter, a native of Pest, Hungary, arrived in France in Salins-les-Thermes where he met Marie-Josephte, who came from the region. The couple moved between Dagneux and Tramoyes, where Martin Dumollard was born in 1810. He was baptized in Mionnay because Tramoyes was not a parish at the time. In 1813, the Dumollards had a second child named Raymond, who died at a young age. Martin was subsequently nicknamed "Raymond" by the villagers of Dagneux.

According to some authors, the surname "Dumollard" is a French version of the Hungarian name of Martin's father: "Demola". In this regard, some sources incorrectly connect the name "Dumollard" to the locality of Dagneux named "Le Molard".

At the time of his trial, Dumollard recalled that his father had fled Hungary because of a criminal past there. When the Austro-Hungarian forces armies arrived in Ain in 1814, Pierre Dumollard feared that he would be recognized and fled to Padua. However, troops were also present there, and after he was recognized by the Hungarian forces as a wanted criminal, he was then arrested and executed by dismemberment. Martin Dumollard, aged four, and his mother attended the event.

His mother died impoverished on April 15, 1842, in Dagneux, while her son fled to Lyon due to thefts.

Dumollard began working as a shepherd at the age of eight. He was a servant under Guichard, owner of Sure castle in Saint-André-de-Corcy, where he met Marie-Anne Martinet, with whom he married much later, on June 29, 1840. After their marriage, the young couple settled in the village of Le Montellier in Côtière, before resettling in Dagneux.

== Known crimes ==
His modus operandi was to approach young girls, especially from Lyon, and pretend to be a master employee looking for a new servant. Dumollard offered significant emoluments for this type of job and then trained the young girls, who usually learned quickly, in the rural region of Côtière de l'Ain. Some of these girls would later become his victims.

The investigation led by Justice Genod de Trévoux revealed only twelve assaults (including three murders), plans for assault and robbery. The attacks were extremely violent, as evidenced by that of Marie-Eulalie Bussod on February 26, 1861, who after being stripped of her clothes, was wounded in the head and raped before being buried alive.

The twelve victims were as following:

1. Marie Baday (murdered), end of February 1855
2. Olympe Alubert, March 4, 1855
3. Josephte Charletty, September 22, 1855
4. Jeanne-Marie Bourgeois, October 31, 1855
5. Victorine Perrin, November 1855
6. Unidentified woman in the woods of Montmain (murdered), November or December 1855
7. Julie Fargeat, January 18, 1859
8. Unidentified woman in the Sainte-Croix mill, December 11, 1859
9. The Laborde daughter in the inn, February 1860
10. Louise Michel, April 30, 1860
11. Marie-Eulalie Bussod (murdered), February 25 or 26, 1861
12. Marie Pichon (attempted murder), May 26, 1861

The absence of proven murders between 1855 and 1859 was also examined. Dumollard was seen accompanied by a girl in Vénissieux in 1856 or 1857, before leaving. The body of the same girl was later found in this neighborhood, which became the lieu-dit of "The dead woman". Some of Dumollard's stories portray accomplices who would have killed her in Neyron. Finally, after 648 examined cases, Dumollard's guilt could only be established in the twelve attacks cited above.

=== Marie Baday ===
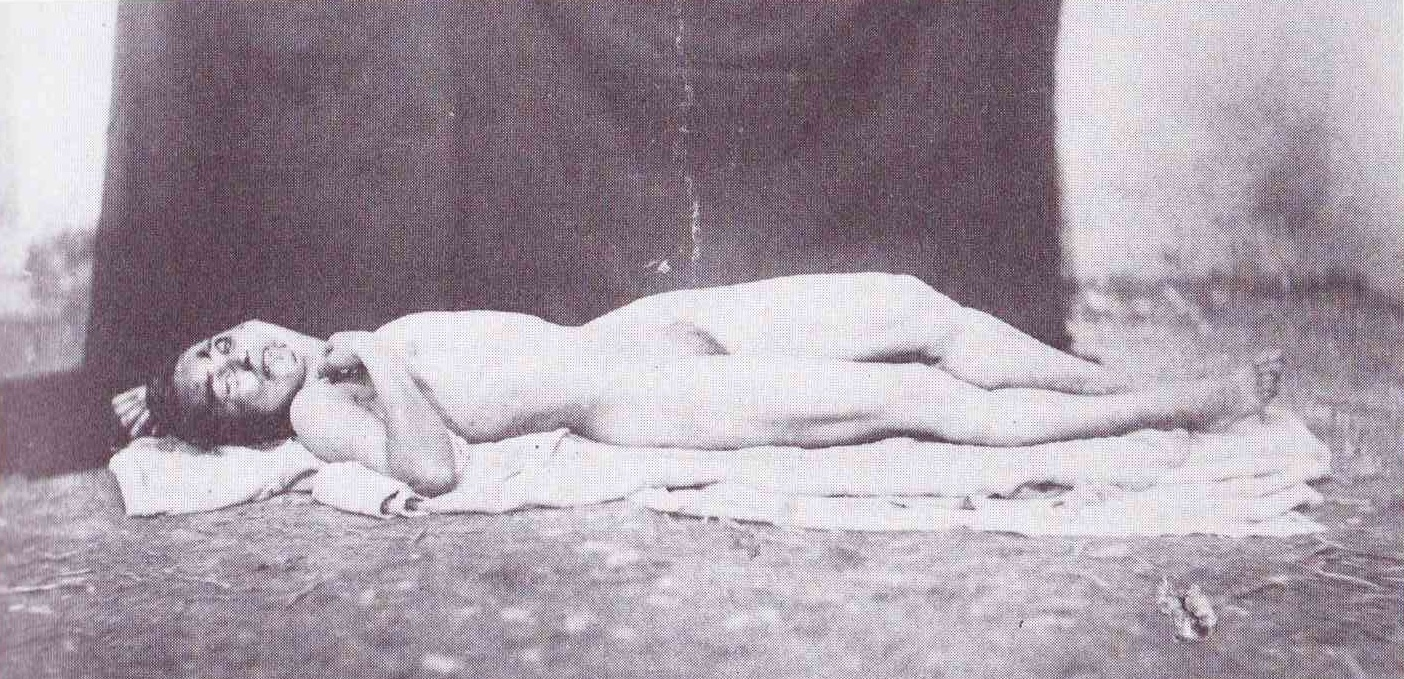
Photograph of Marie Baday's body by Bernabé in 1855, exposed on the forecourt of the church of Tramoyes

The first proven crime occurred in late February 1855 with the murder of Marie Baday, whose body discovered by hunters in the forest of Montaverne in Tramoyes. Her identification took several months. For help, the examining magistrate Genod asked renowned Lyonnais photographer Camille Bernabé to take photographs of the victim. After first being identified as Marceline Ganelli, the body was finally associated with the name of Marie Baday through the efforts of her family. Her landlady, Madeleine Aussandon said that on the day of her disappearance, she left her room after arguing about her rent, saying she had a better offer somewhere else. The first murder suspect was a man named Jacques Verger, who remained three months in prison after his arrest before being exonerated. A second suspect, Martin Mauriat, was also considered but he was in prison by the time of Baday's murder.

=== Olympe Alubert ===
Judge Genod received a report of the case of a girl who appeared to have been assaulted in March 1855 before finding refuge at the Barbet family, at their farm in Mionnay. Subsequently, the investigation collected the testimony of the assaulted girl, named Olympe Alubert. Genod thus obtained the modus operandi of the aggressor. Dumollard had approached her on February 25, 1855, at the La Guillotière in Lyon, offering her a good, very well-paid place "between Neuville-sur-Saône and Miribel." The following Sunday, he picked her up, and when they arrived in the Mionnay area, he assaulted her, but Alubert managed to escape.

In her testimony, Olympe gave several elements relating to the yet unidentified Dumollard:

"He just has a misshapen lip. [...] He inspired with confidence despite his swollen lip, with his good nature [...], speaking French very well. He seemed to be in his fifties.

=== Josephte Charletty ===
Josephte Charletty, a native of Saint-Félix and a servant at Vernaison, testified in September 1855 that Dumollard had approached her in Lyon offering her a place to stay in Côtière. She agreed to meet her new boss on September 22. They left Lyon, walking on the plateau of La Croix-Rousse and through the Fort de Montessuy. Dumollard's repeated questions about any savings she might have on her made Charletty distrustful. She took the initiative to ask for lodging for the night on a farm, agreeing to meet Dumollard the next day, which she did not honour. She returned to Lyon and filed a complaint.

=== Jeanne-Marie Bourgeois ===
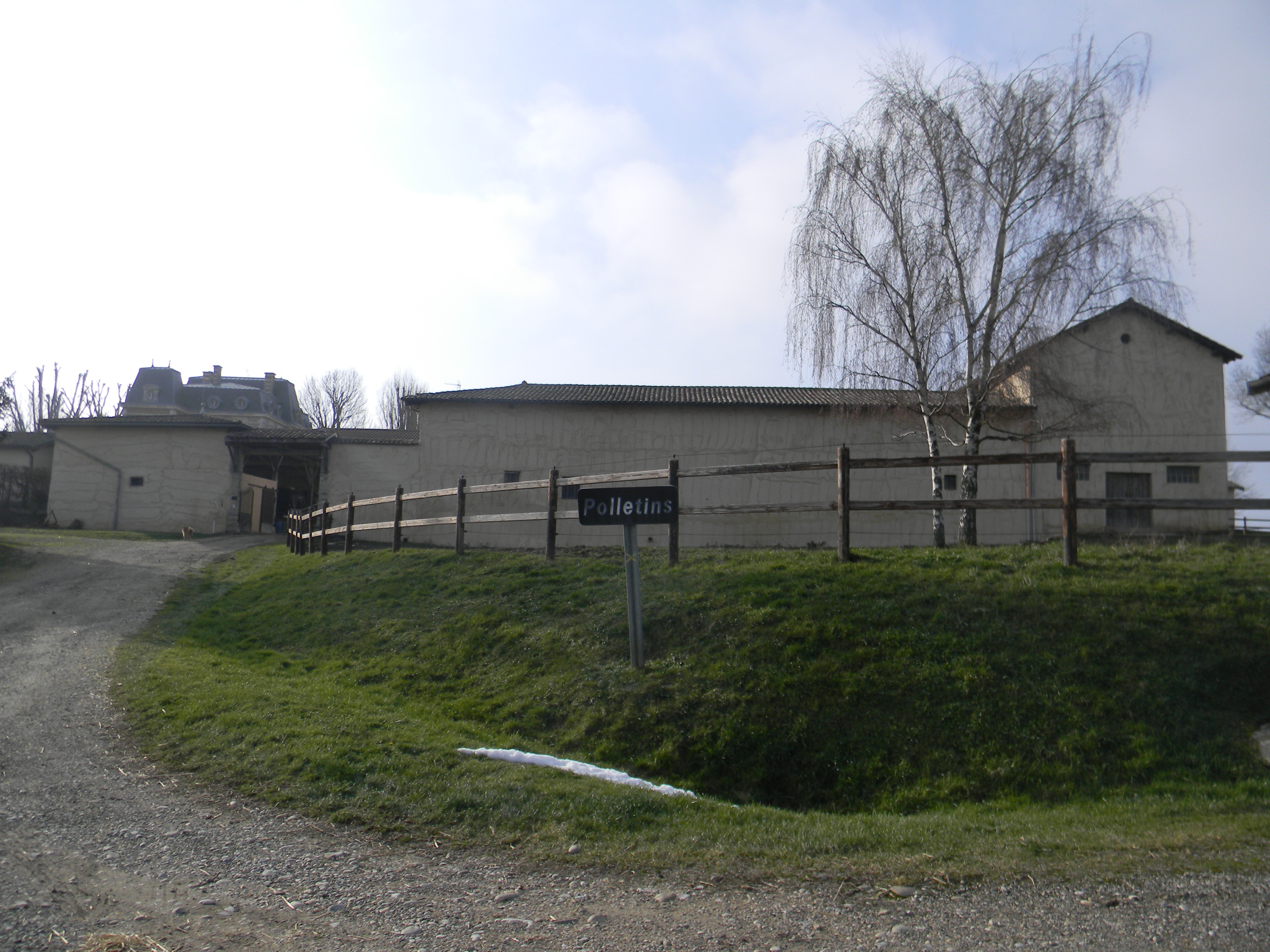
Domaine de Polletins (in 2013), where Jeanne-Marie Bourgeois found help on October 31, 1855, in the evening

Dumollard used the same tactic on October 30, 1855. He approached 22-year-old La Chapelle-Thècle native Jeanne-Marie Bourgeois in Lyon, and offered her a nice place in Trévoux. The young woman was convinced and they hit the road the following day. Increasingly suspicious and worried about the journey, she left Dumollard's company and ran towards the first farm she saw. She was found in Polletins field close to the ancient monastery of Polletins in Mionnay. Benoît Berthelier, the farmer who came upon her, immediately linked with the murder of Marie Baday, discovered in the forest of Montaverne in February of that year. In March–April 1856, Mlle Bourgeois was questioned by Judge Genod in the context of the "Marie Baday case". At that time, Jacques Verger was incarcerated; Genod therefore organized a confrontation. The woman's testimony helped clear him as she did not recognize the man.

=== Victorine Perrin ===
In November 1855, Dumollard managed to persuade 22-year-old Victorine Perrin, from Lons-le-Saunier, to follow him to Côtière, again with the promise of a good place to stay. He also managed to persuade her to put her most precious things in a small trunk that he offered to carry. They left towards Montluel through La Croix-Rousse then to Rillieux. In the neighborhood of Neyron, Dumollard fled, stealing all of her belongings. Perrin was collected by Neyron residents shortly thereafter.

=== Unidentified woman in the Montmain Woods ===
The case of the woman in the Montmain Woods (near Dagneux) became known after the arrest of Dumollard and his wife. On July 28, 1861, Judge Genod interrogated Marie-Anne Martinet. During the interrogation, she told that her husband had killed a girl four years ago in the Montmain Woods. One evening, he returned with some of the victims' belongings, including gold earrings. He then returned to the victim to bury her, going to the Montluel station the next day with a trunk in which her body was stored. On July 31, Genod, Guillot (a clerk), Messrs. De Piellard (Imperial Attorney) and Raspail (Gendarme Commander of the Borough) accompanied the woman in handcuffs to the Montmain Woods, and after some searching, the girl's body was discovered. Dumollard denied guilt, despite his wife's claims.

=== Julie Fargeat ===
Dumollard approached Julie Fargeat on January 17, 1859, in Lyon. This girl, originating from Thizy, had just lost her residence due to pregnancy. She was persuaded to accept employment in the area of Saint-André-de-Corcy that Dumollard offered, and travelled towards it the next day. As night fell, Dumollard attacked her, pulling off her apron containing her savings. She screamed so loudly that he fled; her cries attracted two villagers, Simon Mallet and his son Louis. On January 20, she filed a statement with the gendarmes of Saint-André-de-Corcy. Having no document to prove her identity (as it was stolen), her claim was met with skepticism and she was charged with Vagrancy.

=== Unidentified woman in Sainte-Croix ===
On December 11, 1859, a miller from Sainte-Croix named Jean-Pierre Chrétien indirectly witnessed an attack on a woman in Sainte-Croix. As the woman was never found or identified, the attacks was one of twelve cases selected at Dumollard's trial, in which Chrétien was one of seventy-one witnesses. The events were as follows: in the evening, shortly after seeing a young woman accompanied by a man carrying a package, she came running back. She explained that the man had fled with her savings and her parcel containing her personal belongings. Chrétien tried to catch the thief, but was unsuccessful. He let the girl stay at his home for the night before leaving for Lyon on the following morning. In the absence of other details, the young woman is called "The Unknown of Sainte-Croix" in court documents.

=== The Laborde daughter of the inn ===
Very little is known about this woman. The case concerning the victim has, above all, provided a better understanding of Dumollard's modus operandi. If his method of approach was invariable, it appeared that he also had certain habits every time he came to Lyon: he regularly ate at Marguerite Chorel's restaurant at 7, and usually slept in the Laborde Inn held by Louise-Adèle Fleury, wife of Louis Laborde. In the beginning of February 1860, Dumollard presented himself at the inn, accompanied by a young girl who, he said, was his niece, asking for a room with two beds. A few moments later, the girl fled, pursued by Dumollard. She came at the end of February 1860 to the Laborde Inn, as the survey revealed. It is not known who she was or if Dumollard managed to catch her. However, during the investigation, Ms. Laborde formally recognized the tote and dress of the girl among the objects taken from Dumollard's home, which suggests an additional murder.

=== Louise Michel ===
Dumollard met Michel on April 29, 1860. He managed to convince her without difficulty to follow him and made an appointment for the next day on the Tilsit bridge. They took the path of Neuville-sur-Saône then Civrieux on horseback and on foot. In the neighborhood of Civrieux, Dumollard attacked Michel and threatened her to hand over her money. She managed to escape and was collected by a farmer named Claude Aymond.

Dumollard renounced this act, and continued towards Saint-André-de-Corcy by cutting through farmland, where he met two peasants who asked what he was doing. It turned out it was Simon and Louis Mallet, from two years earlier, in January 1859, who saved Julie Fargeat. In May 1860, the Mallets, accompanied by Claude Aymond, testified before Judge Genod in Trévoux. This brought Michel in Trévoux and exonerated an incarcerated suspect named Audrillat, whom she did not recognize. It seemed that at this time, Judge Genod had little faith in the hypothesis of the culprit with "misshapen lip" for all the attacks on the maids.

=== Marie-Eulalie Bussod ===
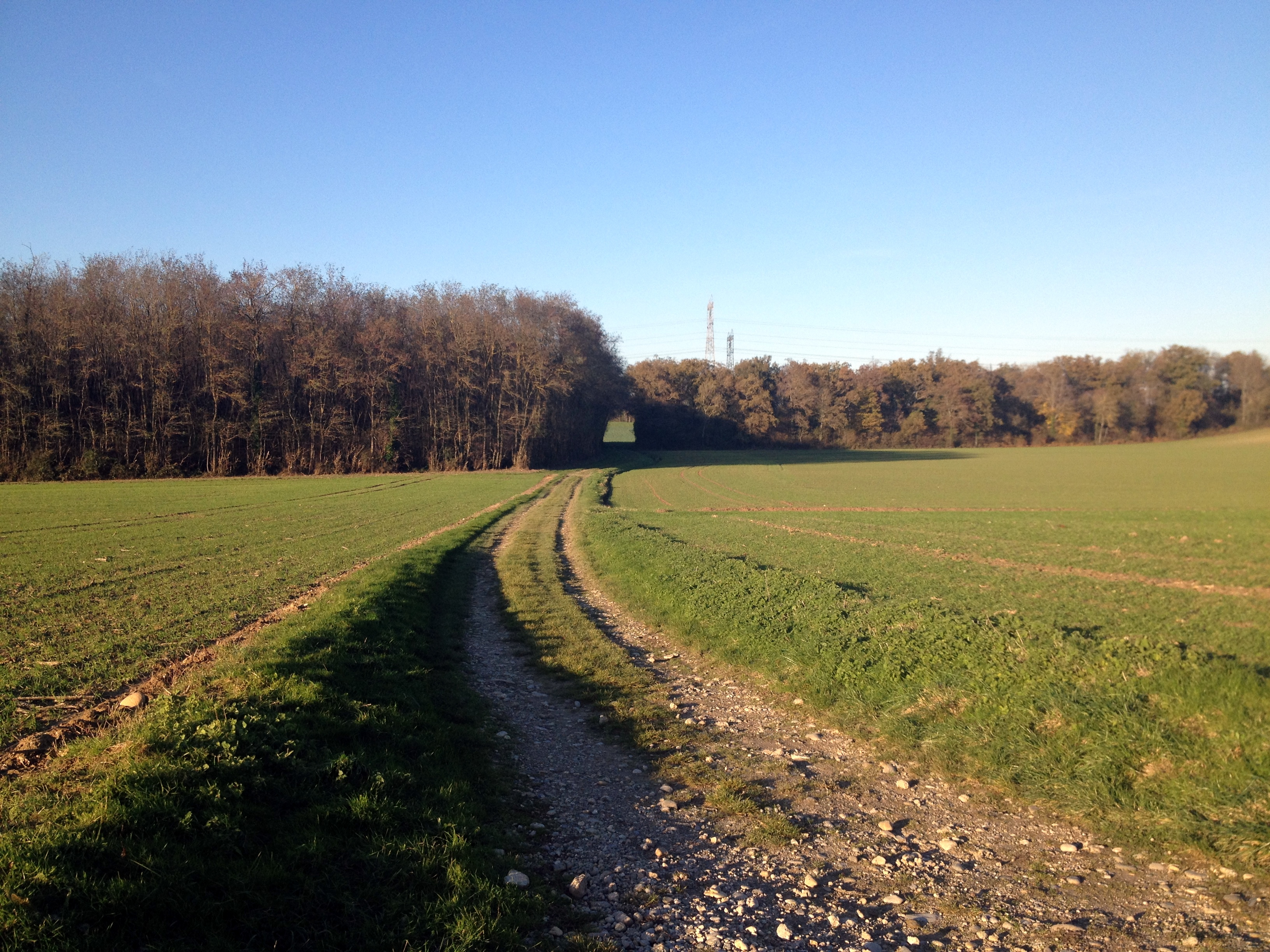
View of "The Woods of the Dead" in Pizay in November 2013

Only after Dumollard's arrest in May 1861 and the following interest around the case did three women report to the authorities the disappearance of their sister Marie-Eulalie in February 1861, when an individual had visited her and proposed that she work as a maid. Judge Genod listened to one of the sisters' testimonies, that of Marie-Josephte, on July 16, 1861, in Trévoux. She was presented with the many items of clothing seized from Dumollard and stored in Trévoux, recognizing some of them as belonging to her missing sister. Marie-Josephte having furtively met the visitor who proposed the post, Genod undertook to confront her with Dumollard; she immediately recognized him as the man whom her sister followed several months ago.

Following Marie-Anne Martinet's revelations, Genod inspected the woods near Pizay on July 31. On August 1, Martinet and Dumollard were taken separately to the place where, against all expectations, Dumollard said:

"I know where the body is and I am ready to take you there."

Dumollard kept his word and a buried body was quickly exhumed. Early findings contributed to the conclusion that the victim was buried alive after being raped. The three sisters were called in Pizay and identified the body as that of Bussod. The emotions were so strong in Pizay that two crosses were quickly placed on the communal territory, the first being on the place of the body's discovery which since has been called the "Woods of the Dead". It bears the following inscription:

Here Marie-Eulalie Bussod was murdered
February 25, 1861
De profundis

The second is located at the Pizay cemetery and bears the following inscription:

Here lies one of the victims of an infamous murderer
Marie-Eulalie Bussod
Aged 42 years from Loisia
Murdered on February 25
And buried on August 2, 1861
De profundis

In November 2013, neither the cross of the cemetery nor the cross in the "Woods of the Dead" seemed to be present at the places indicated. The book Tourist and archaeological Riches of Montluel Township from 1999 indicated the latter as always located in the woods, but in 2013, it was reported as missing on the website of the Pizay town.

=== Marie Pichon and Dumollard's arrest ===
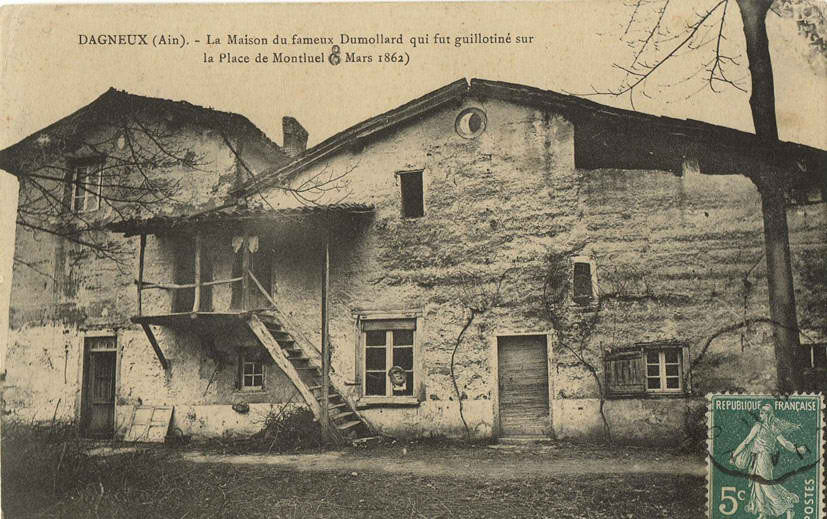
Dumollard's house in Dagneux.

On May 28, 1861, Dumollard approached Marie Pichon on the Guillotière bridge in Lyon and offered her a job as a maid in Dagneux with an annual pay of 250 francs. Pichon accepted, gathered her few belongings in a trunk and accompanied Dumollard to the train station in Montluel, where they arrived at late evening. Then followed a walk in the woods, to the heights of Dagneux. There Dumollard assaulted and tried to strangle her with a lariat, but Pichon escaped, and ran to find refuge in Joly farm in Balan, with Mr. Joly then contacting the garde champêtre in Dagneux. Listening to the precise description of Marie Pichon, the authorities were reminded of the domiciled Dumollard in Dagneux. After a quick visit to the home of "Raymond", as the Dagneux villagers called him, guards immediately warned Judge Genod, who ordered for the suspect to be arrested on June 2, 1861. The next day, a first confrontation took place between Pichon and Dumollard, whom she recognized immediately.

The investigation established that one of the objectives of the murders was the theft of fabrics and clothes. During the search at the home of the accused, the investigators found 1250 women's clothes (garters, stockings, petticoats, handkerchiefs, lace shawls, hats, dresses, etc.) belonging to the victims. Dumollard and his wife were imprisoned in Trévoux while awaiting trial, which was to be held on January 29, 1862, in Bourg-en-Bresse.

== Trial and execution ==
=== Trial ===
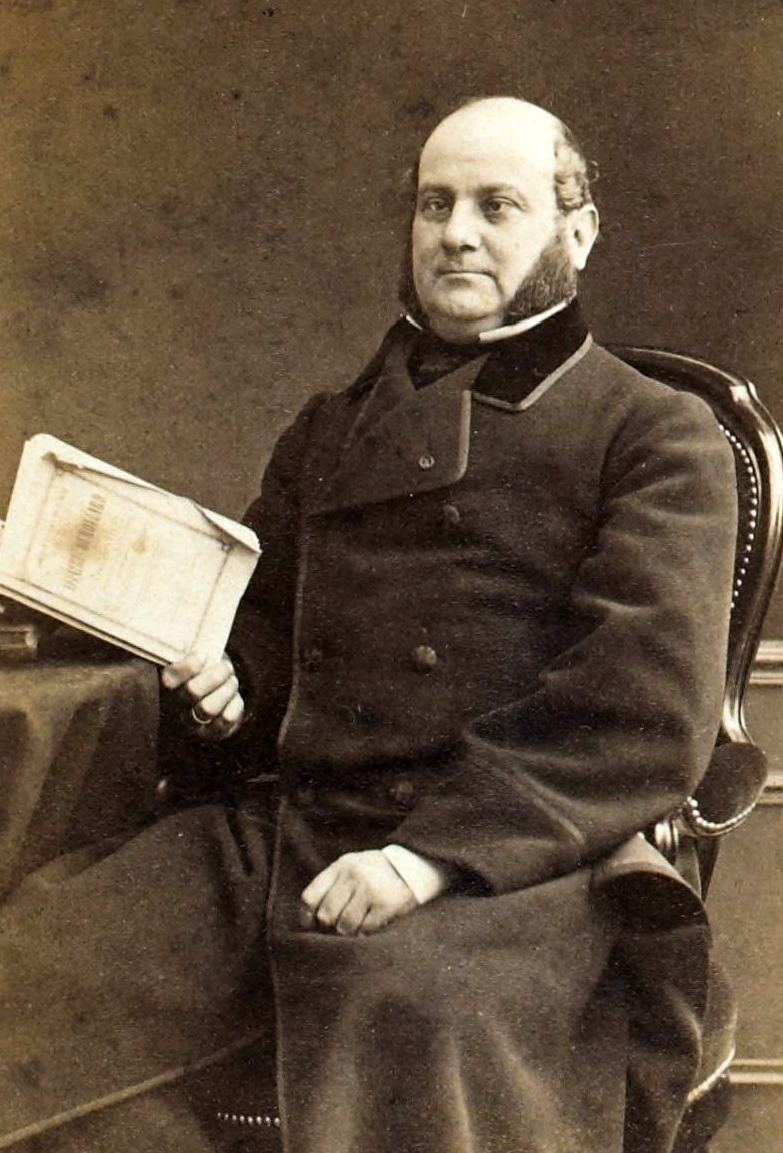
Maître Lardière, one of Dumollard's two lawyers.

Dumollard's trial ran from January 29 to February 1, 1862, in the Bourg-en-Bresse court, before which a crowd of 4,000 to 5,000 people attended on the morning of January 29. Two lawyers defended Dumollard: Marius Lardière and Mr. Villeneuve. Ladière was chosen by Dumollard because he was from Dagneux. The courthouse welcomed journalists from a dozen periodicals, including Le salute republic, Le Loire Memorial, the Journal de Genève and Le Progrès. Darmet Guerin, a bookseller, was responsible for the trial's transcript. The prosecution was represented by Louis Gaulot (Attorney General), Prandière (prosecutor) and Joachim Jeandet (imperial prosecutor). The cour d'assises was presided over by Marilhat, assisted by the vice-president of Varennes and thirty-six jurors, all from the communities surrounding Ain.

In addition to the reciting of the charges as well as the list of 71 witnesses scheduled, the first day was devoted to successive interrogations of Dumollard and his wife. January 30 and 31 were mainly devoted to the presentation of the many exhibits (the hundreds of personal items seized by Dumollard) and the hearing of witnesses. The hearing of February 1 was devoted to the end of the evidentiary hearings, the indictment and pleadings until about four in the afternoon. The jury left the room to examine the various questions and returned at about 18:15. President Marilhat began to question their spokesman, Jean-Jacques Celsi on different verdicts made by the jury to successive questions. The court retired to deliberate and returned about thirty minutes later. President Marilhat announced the various sentences: Dumollard was sentenced to death and his wife was sentenced to twenty years of penal labor. She died in the Auberive prison, in Haute-Marne, where she was incarcerated, in 1875.

=== Execution ===
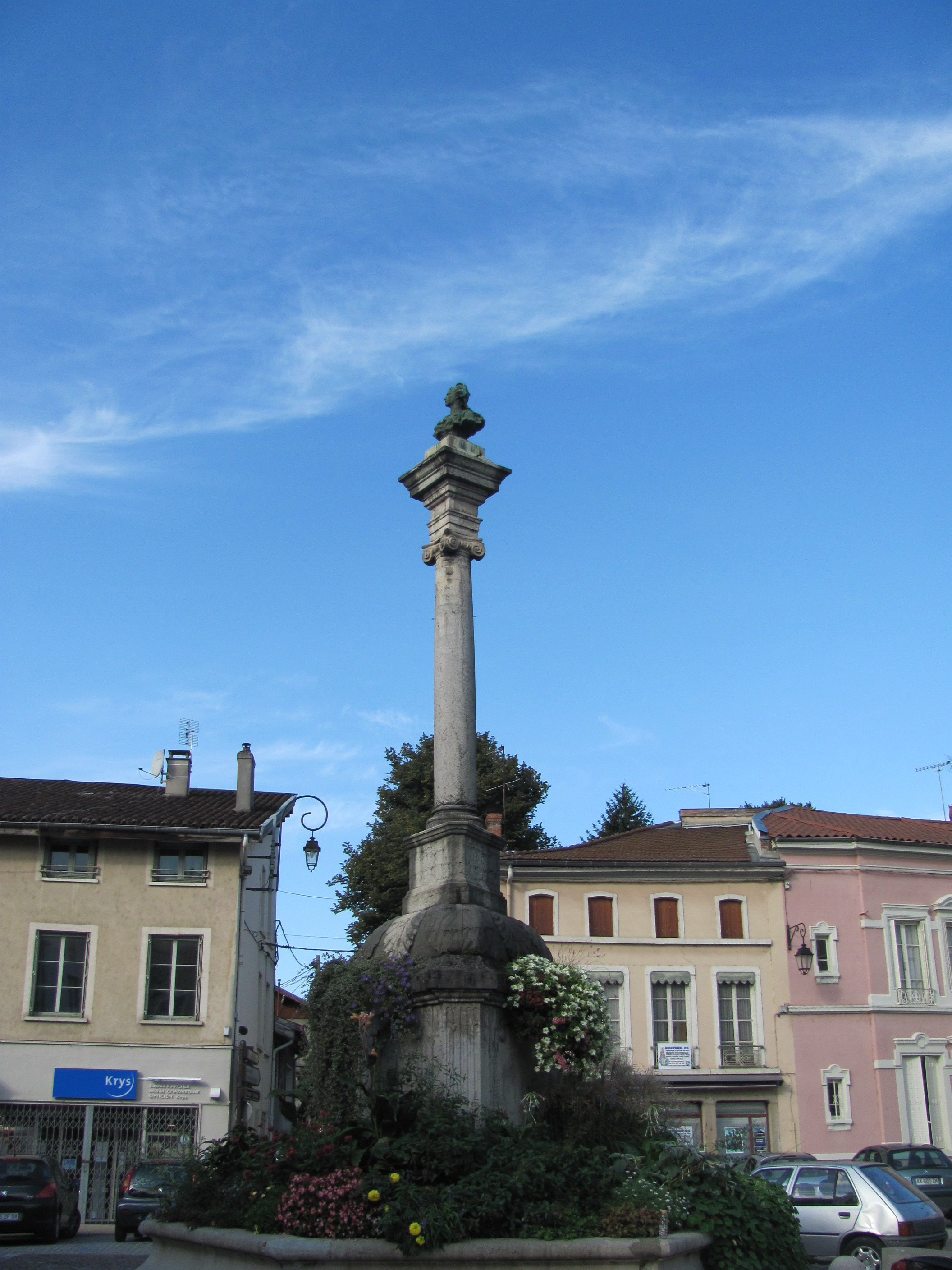
Place Bourgeat (renamed since "Place Carnot"), where Dumollard was guillotined.

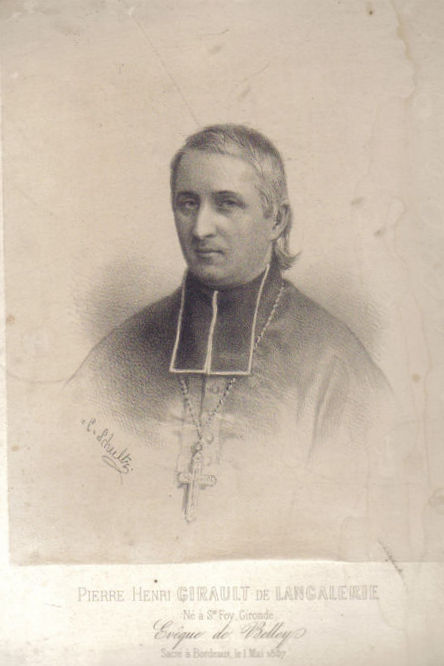
Lithograph of Mr. Langalerie who met Dumollard in his cell in February 1862.

After his death sentence on February 1, 1862, Dumollard was again imprisoned in Bourg-en-Bresse. He received several visits from Lardière first, then Father Béroud and a prison vicar. He was also visited by Mr. Langalerie, bishop of Belley, who sought repentance unsuccessfully on his part. He nevertheless gave him his blessings and offered a portrait of St. John Vianney.

On February 27, 1862, Dumollard learned that his cassation appeal was rejected, and the two lawyers assigned for the occasion, Achille Morin and Gigot, having not even filed a brief. He was also informed of the execution method chosen, the guillotine, an announcement to which he reacted by saying: "I like it better than to be like my father, quartered on a wheel being pulled in all directions by horses."

On March 7, 1862, the guillotine stored in Bourg-en-Bresse was carried away in Montluel. That same day, Father Béroud asked that Dumollard be allowed to share a last meal with his wife. Soon after, he was taken to Montluel on horseback, accompanied by Father Béroud. The car arrived on March 8 at four in the morning in Montluel, awaited by a large crowd despite the morning schedule. As the Montluel Prison was in very poor condition, Dumollard was led to the Council Chamber where magistrate Simonnet awaited. He agreed to a final interview in private between Dumollard, Father Béroud and the priest of Montluel, Carrel. Dumollard then drank a cup of coffee, then a last glass of Madeira wine.

At 6:45, Dumollard was asked to use the horseback to go to the scaffold 150 meters away, which he refused. Accompanied by Father Béroud, the parish priest Carrel and the executioners, and in front of a crowd of 5,000, Dumollard walked on foot to Bourgeat Square (now Place Carnot) where a scaffold was installed, on which he kneeled and kissed the crucifix presented. He was executed around 7 o'clock in the morning.

== Other serial killers of the 1800s ==
Dumollard was often compared to Joseph Philippe (murderer of prostitutes in France around 1866), Eusebius Pieydagnelle (killer of six girls in 1871) and Joseph Vacher who also murdered in Ain in the mid-1890s. Dumollard is regularly presented as the first serial killer identified, in chronological terms, in Western Europe.

== Posterity ==
=== Dumollard's head ===
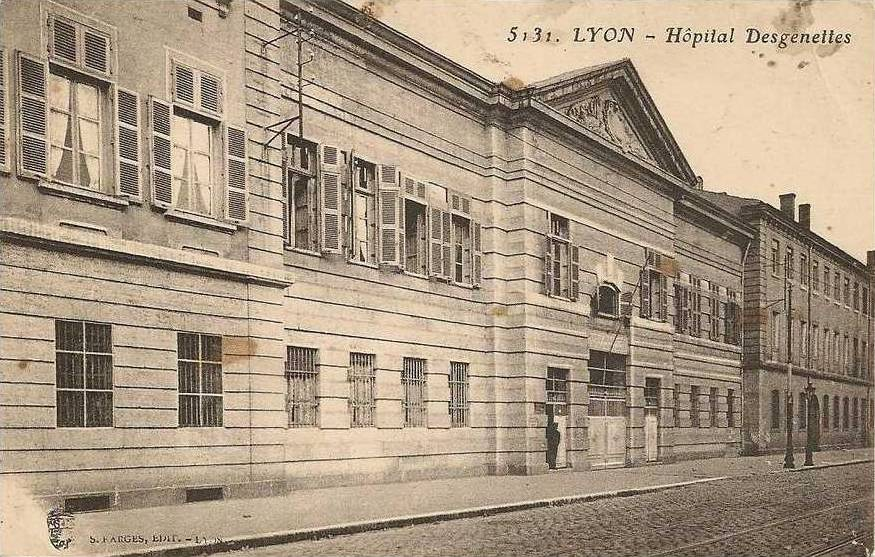
The former hospital Desgenettes, where Dumollard's skull was studied in the 1960s.

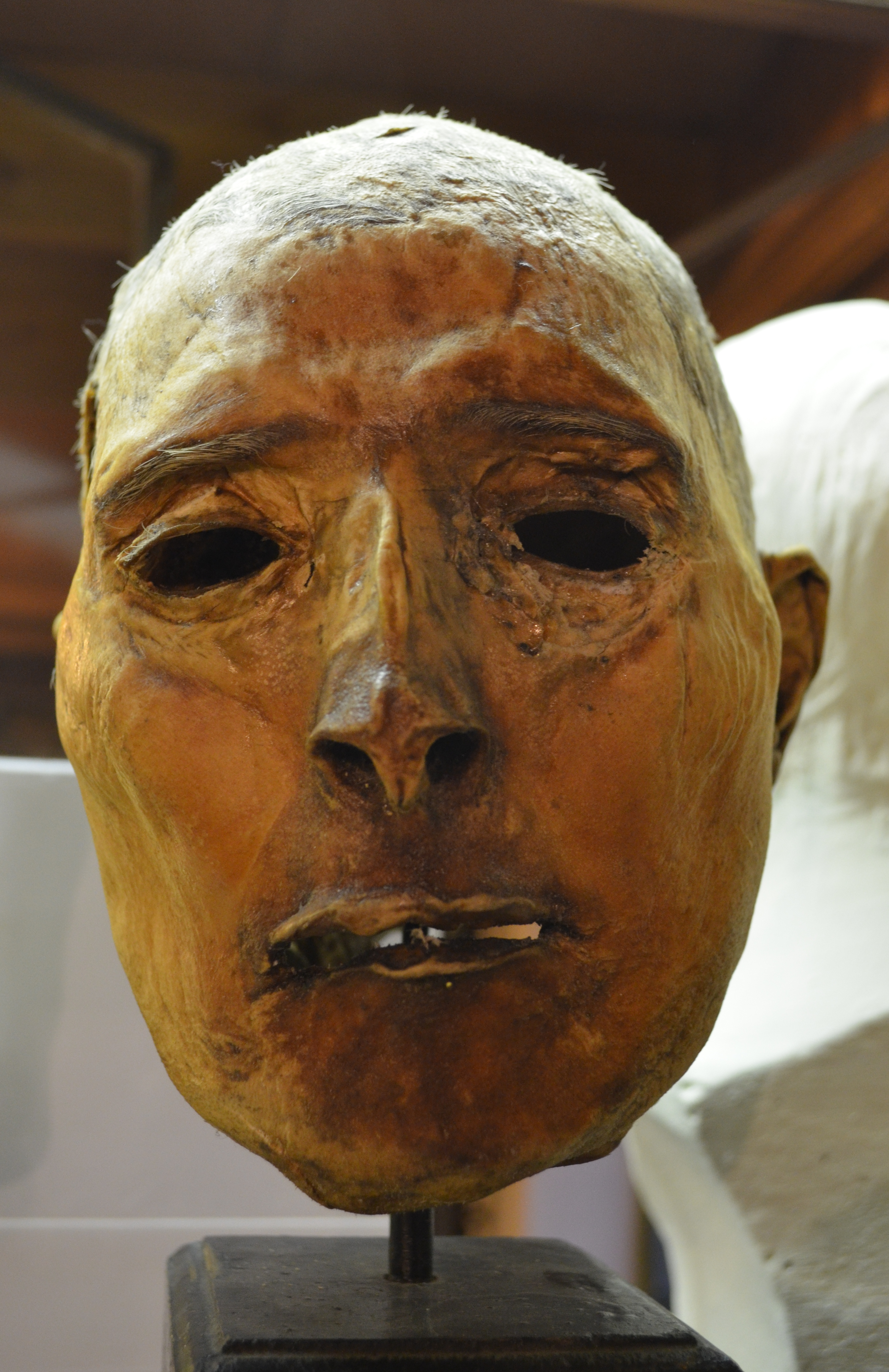
Dumollard's face reconstructed from his skin and scalp highlightning his labial angioma (preserved at the Testut-Latarjet Museum).

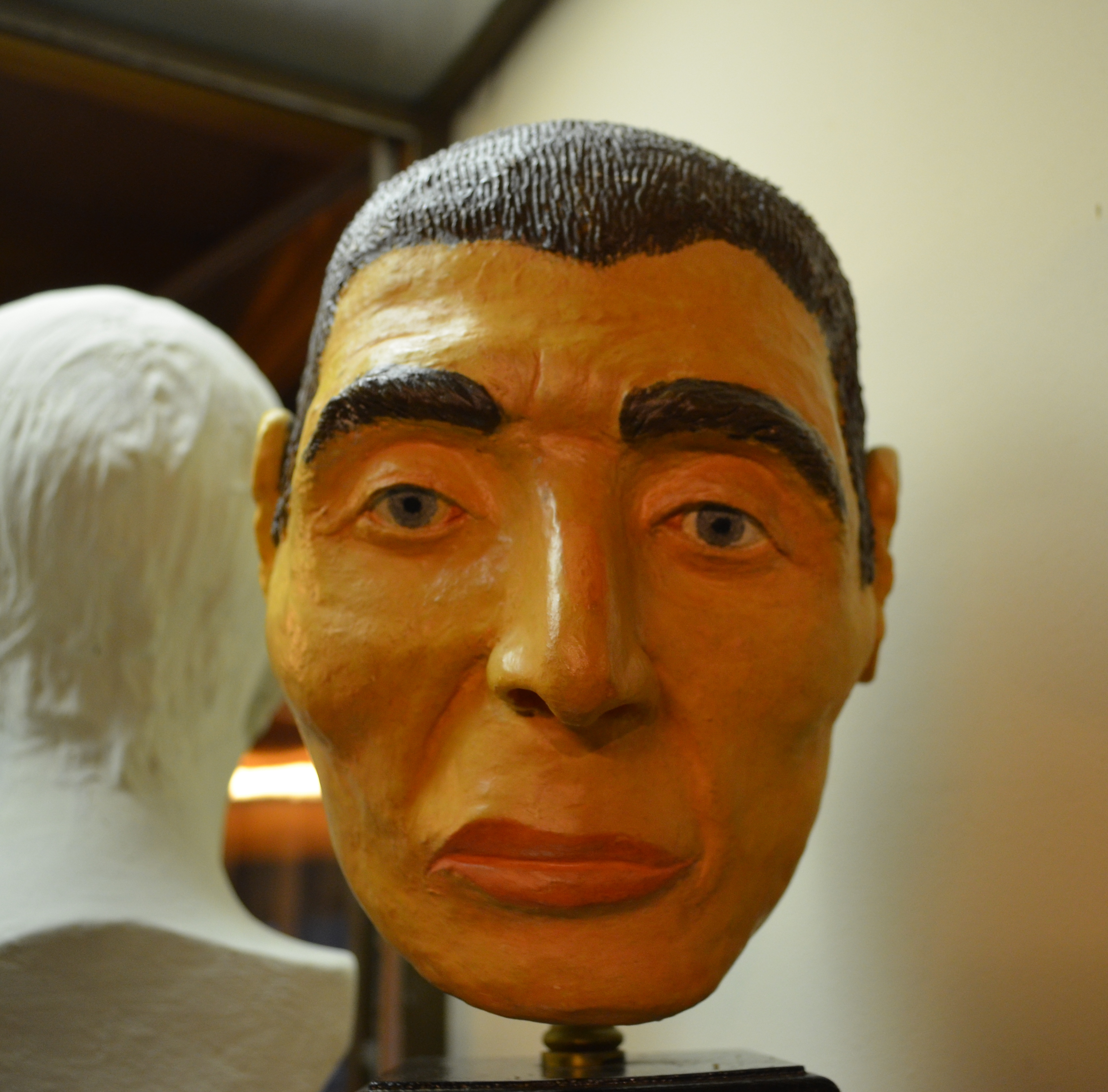
Result of the DMP method applied to Dumollard and kept at the Testut-Latarjet Museum.

Following his execution, Dumollard's body was buried in an indeterminate place, even if a strong presumption indicates that his resting place might be at the edge of the adjoining St. Bartholomew's Chapel of Montluel. The man's head was sent (in a special box) to the Lyon Medical School at the beginning of March 1862. Upon receipt, studies were launched to analyze Dumollard's skull: thus several cast plasters are kept in the Testus-Latarjet Museum.

The skull was gradually abandoned and forgotten before being analyzed again in the 1960s. These works on the skull at the Hôpital d'instruction des armées Desgenettes concluded that Dumollard had an angioma on his lip.

In the mid-1980s, three researchers from Lyon, Claire Desbois, Claude Mallet and Raoul Perrot, developed a method of reconstructing the face from data derived from the single bone structure. They call it "DMP", of their initials, using this method to make a three dimensional representation of Dumollard's face. Comparison with photographs from the period were used to validate the new method. The result of this experimentation, the bust made from Dumollard's head after execution and the reconstituted face from the real skin of Dumollard are all preserved at the Testut-Latarjet Museum.

=== Artistic references ===
Victor Hugo makes an explicit reference to Martin Dumollard in Volume I of his novel Les Misérables:

"Five years, it will be said, is unlikely. Alas, it's true. Social suffering begins at any age. Have we not seen, recently, the trial of a man named Dumolard, an orphan who became a bandit, who, at the age of five, say official documents, being alone in the world "worked to live, and stole"

In his work Bouvard, Flaubert and Pécuchet, dealing with Bouvard et Pécuchet, Roger Kempf explains that Gustave Flaubert, very much influenced by the Dumollard affair, first named one of his characters "Dumolard", who later became "Dubolard", and finally "Bouvard."

On television, in 1967, an episode of the television series En votre âme et conscience called The Dumollard Affair was devoted to the serial killer. It was directed by Jean Bertho and the actor Étienne Bierry played the role of Dumollard.

== See also ==
- List of French serial killers

== In the media ==
- Christophe Hondelatte: Martin Dumollad, the Maid Killer, Europe 1, October 13, 2016
