= Bourg-Saint-Christophe =

Commune in Auvergne-Rhône-Alpes, France

- Commune
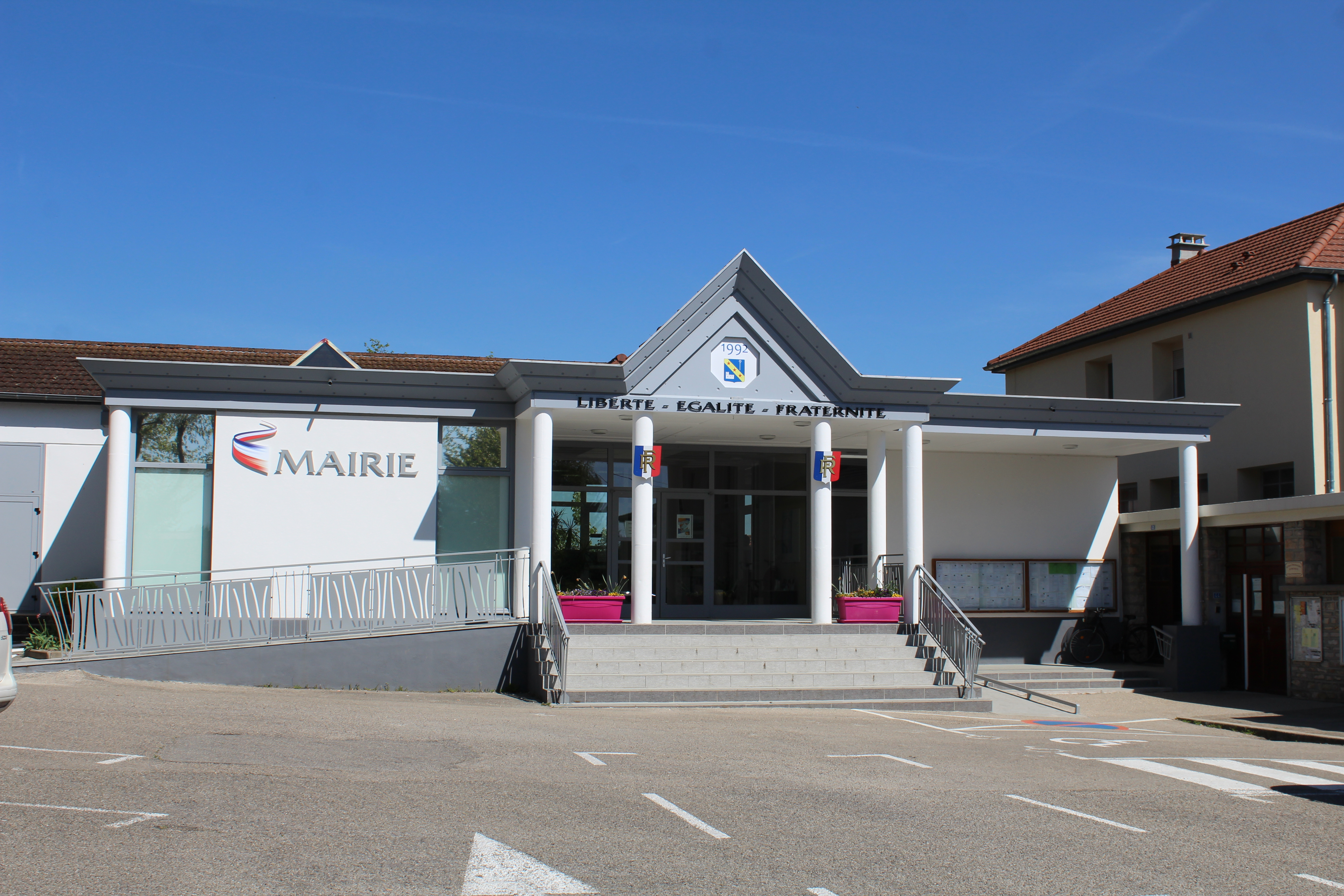
- Town hall

- Coat of arms
- Location of Bourg-Saint-Christophe
- Location within France Location within Auvergne-Rhône-Alpes
- Coordinates: 45°53′28″N 5°09′42″E
- Country: France
- Region: Auvergne-Rhône-Alpes
- Department: Ain
- Arrondissement: Belley
- Canton: Meximieux
- Intercommunality: Plaine de l'Ain

Government
  - Mayor (2026–32): Bernard Perret
- Area^{1}: 8.98 km^{2} (3.47 sq mi)
- Elevation: 209 m (686 ft)
- Highest elevation: 305 m (1,001 ft)
- Lowest elevation: 207 m (679 ft)
- Population (2023): 1,562
  - Density: 174/km^{2} (451/sq mi)
- Time zone: UTC+01:00 (CET)
  - Summer (DST): UTC+02:00 (CEST)
- INSEE/Postal code: 01054 /01800
- Website: https://www.bourg-saint-christophe.fr/
- ^{1} French Land Register data, which excludes lakes, ponds, glaciers > 1 km^{2} (0.386 sq mi or 247 acres) and river estuaries.

Bourg-Saint-Christophe (French pronunciation: [buʁ sɛ̃ kʁistɔf]) is a commune in the Ain department in eastern France.

It is located between the towns of Meximieux, Pérouges, and Béligneux.

== Population ==
Historical population
Year	Pop.	±% p.a.
1968	507	—
1975	515	+0.22%
1982	659	+3.59%
1990	716	+1.04%
1999	824	+1.57%
2007	1,065	+3.26%
2012	1,230	+2.92%
2017	1,366	+2.12%
2023	1,562	+2.26%
Source: INSEE

== See also ==
- Communes of the Ain department
