= Rignieux-le-Franc =

Rignieux-le-Franc Regniô-lo-Franc (Arpitan)
- Commune
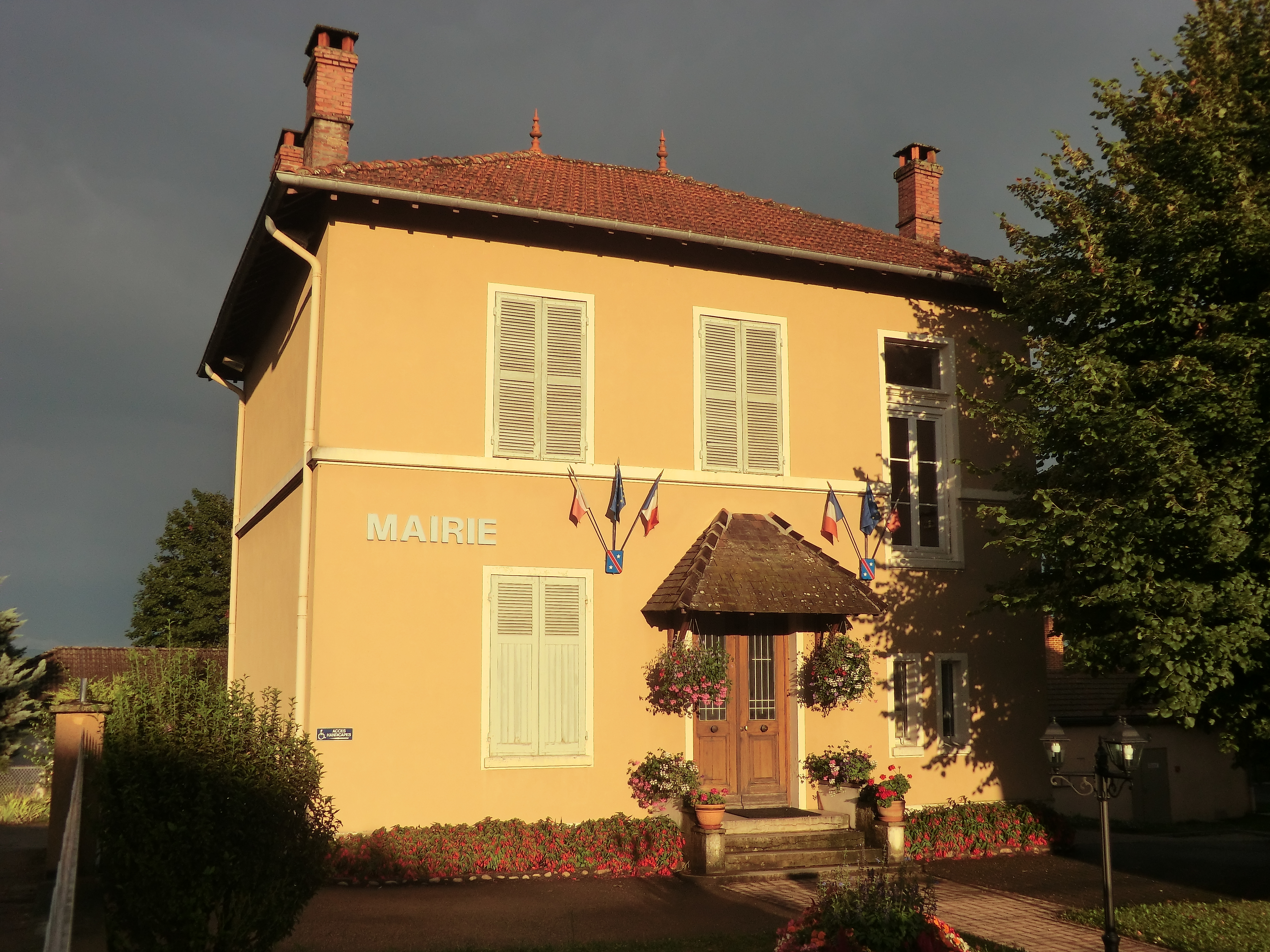
- Town hall

- Coat of arms
- Location of Rignieux-le-Franc
- Location within France Location within Auvergne-Rhône-Alpes
- Coordinates: 45°56′00″N 5°11′00″E
- Country: France
- Region: Auvergne-Rhône-Alpes
- Department: Ain
- Arrondissement: Belley
- Canton: Meximieux

Government
  - Mayor (2026–32): Fabien Thomazet
- Area^{1}: 15.02 km^{2} (5.80 sq mi)
- Elevation: 270 m (890 ft)
- Highest elevation: 316 m (1,037 ft)
- Lowest elevation: 237 m (778 ft)
- Population (2023): 1,180
  - Density: 78.6/km^{2} (203/sq mi)
- Time zone: UTC+01:00 (CET)
  - Summer (DST): UTC+02:00 (CEST)
- INSEE/Postal code: 01325 /01800
- ^{1} French Land Register data, which excludes lakes, ponds, glaciers > 1 km^{2} (0.386 sq mi or 247 acres) and river estuaries.

Rignieux-le-Franc (French pronunciation: [ʁiɲø lə fʁɑ̃]; Arpitan: Regniô-lo-Franc [ri.ˈɲy lɔ frã]) is a commune in the Ain department in eastern France.

== History ==
Property of Alphonse-Louis du Plessis de Richelieu and coming from Fontaines-sur-Saône, an early Christian sarcophagus was stored in Rignieux-le-Franc, before being bought by the Louvre in 1864.

At the end of the 16th century, the lands of Rignieux-le-Franc belonged to the Saillans de Brézenaud.

== Population ==
Historical population
Year	Pop.	±% p.a.
1968	205	—
1975	286	+4.87%
1982	553	+9.88%
1990	743	+3.76%
1999	839	+1.36%
2007	937	+1.39%
2012	960	+0.49%
2017	971	+0.23%
2023	1,180	+3.30%
Source: INSEE

== Geography ==
Rignieux-le-Franc is located about 6 kilometers (3 miles) of Pérouges. The Toison, a tributary of the Ain, flows through the commune.
