= Bressolles =

Bressolles is the name of several communes in France:

- Bressolles, Ain
- Bressolles, Allier
