= Joyeux, Ain =

Commune in Auvergne-Rhône-Alpes, France

Joyeux
- Commune
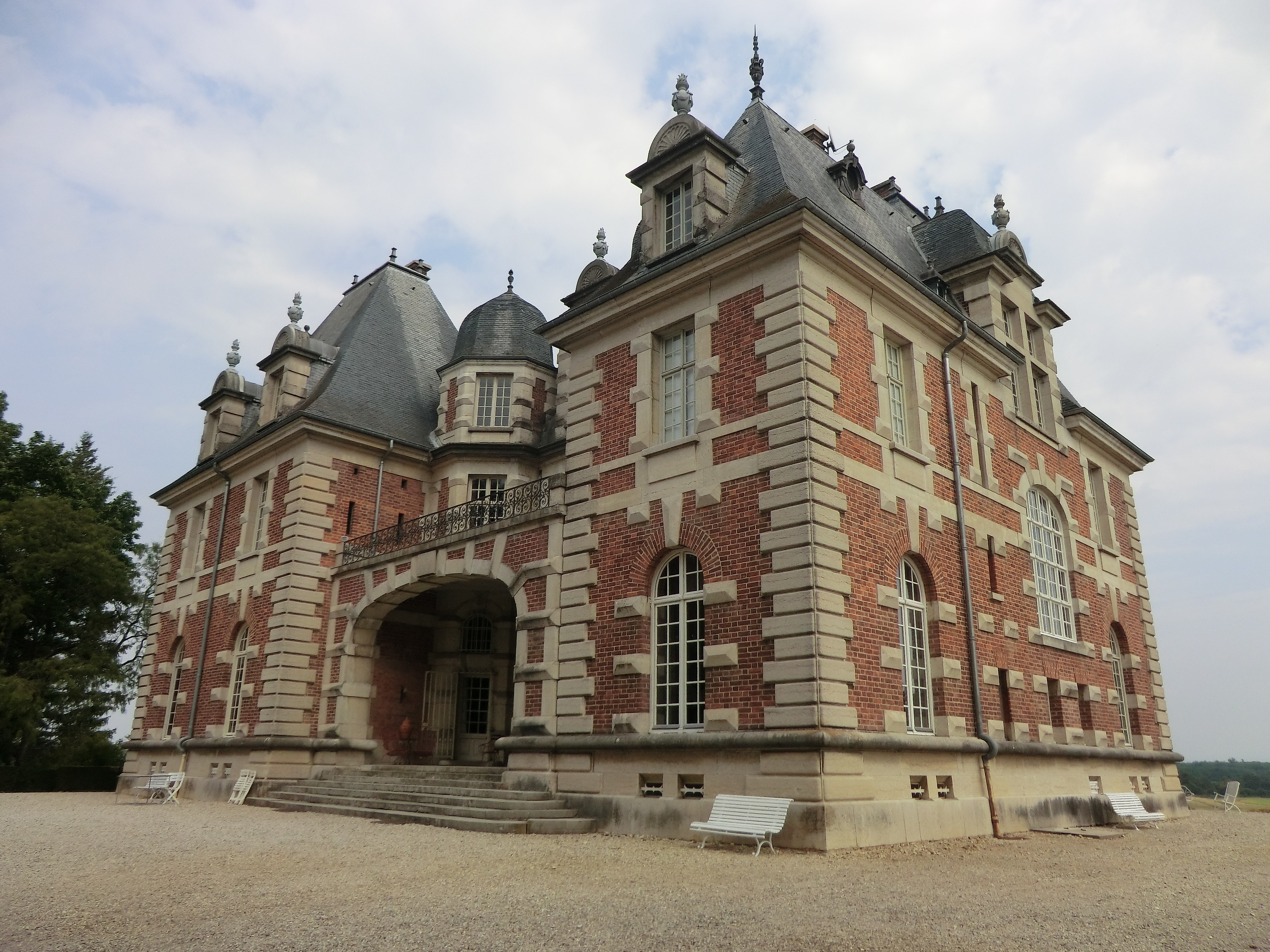
- Chateau
- Location of Joyeux
- Location within France Location within Auvergne-Rhône-Alpes
- Coordinates: 45°57′43″N 5°06′39″E
- Country: France
- Region: Auvergne-Rhône-Alpes
- Department: Ain
- Arrondissement: Belley
- Canton: Meximieux
- Intercommunality: Plaine de l'Ain

Government
  - Mayor (2026–32): Joël Mathy
- Area^{1}: 16.58 km^{2} (6.40 sq mi)
- Elevation: 285 m (935 ft)
- Highest elevation: 298 m (978 ft)
- Lowest elevation: 272 m (892 ft)
- Population (2023): 262
  - Density: 15.8/km^{2} (40.9/sq mi)
- Time zone: UTC+01:00 (CET)
  - Summer (DST): UTC+02:00 (CEST)
- INSEE/Postal code: 01198 /01800
- ^{1} French Land Register data, which excludes lakes, ponds, glaciers > 1 km^{2} (0.386 sq mi or 247 acres) and river estuaries.

Joyeux (French pronunciation: [ʒwajø]; Arpitan: Jouyô) is a commune in the Ain department in eastern France.

== Geography ==
Joyeux lies less than 5 km (3.1 mi) from the wildlife park at Villars-les-Dombes and 40 km (25 mi) from Lyon in the natural region of the Dombes, a wide extent of middle and upper Pleistocene moraine left near the margin of the Alpine ice sheets. The commune includes some thirty lakes which together represent some 4 square kilometres of water. The land between them is of gravel, sand and clay.

== History ==
The fief of Joyeux was mentioned in the twelfth century. In the fifteenth century, it was in the possession of the Villars family.

On 13 February 2006, a wild duck was found dead on the fen. It was the first attested case of the presence of the bird flu virus H5N1 in France.

== Administration ==
List of the mayors
Period	Name	Party	Background
2001-2020	Marius Brocard		Farmer
Since 2020	Joël Mathy		

== Population ==
Historical population
Year	Pop.	±% p.a.
1968	146	—
1975	142	−0.40%
1982	151	+0.88%
1990	171	+1.57%
1999	206	+2.09%
2007	230	+1.39%
2012	250	+1.68%
2017	271	+1.63%
2023	262	−0.56%
Source: INSEE

== Sights ==
Old farms typical of the region. The nineteenth century Château de Joyeux.

== See also ==
- Communes of the Ain department
- Dombes
