= Saint-Éloi, Ain =

Commune in Auvergne-Rhône-Alpes, France

Saint-Éloi
- Commune
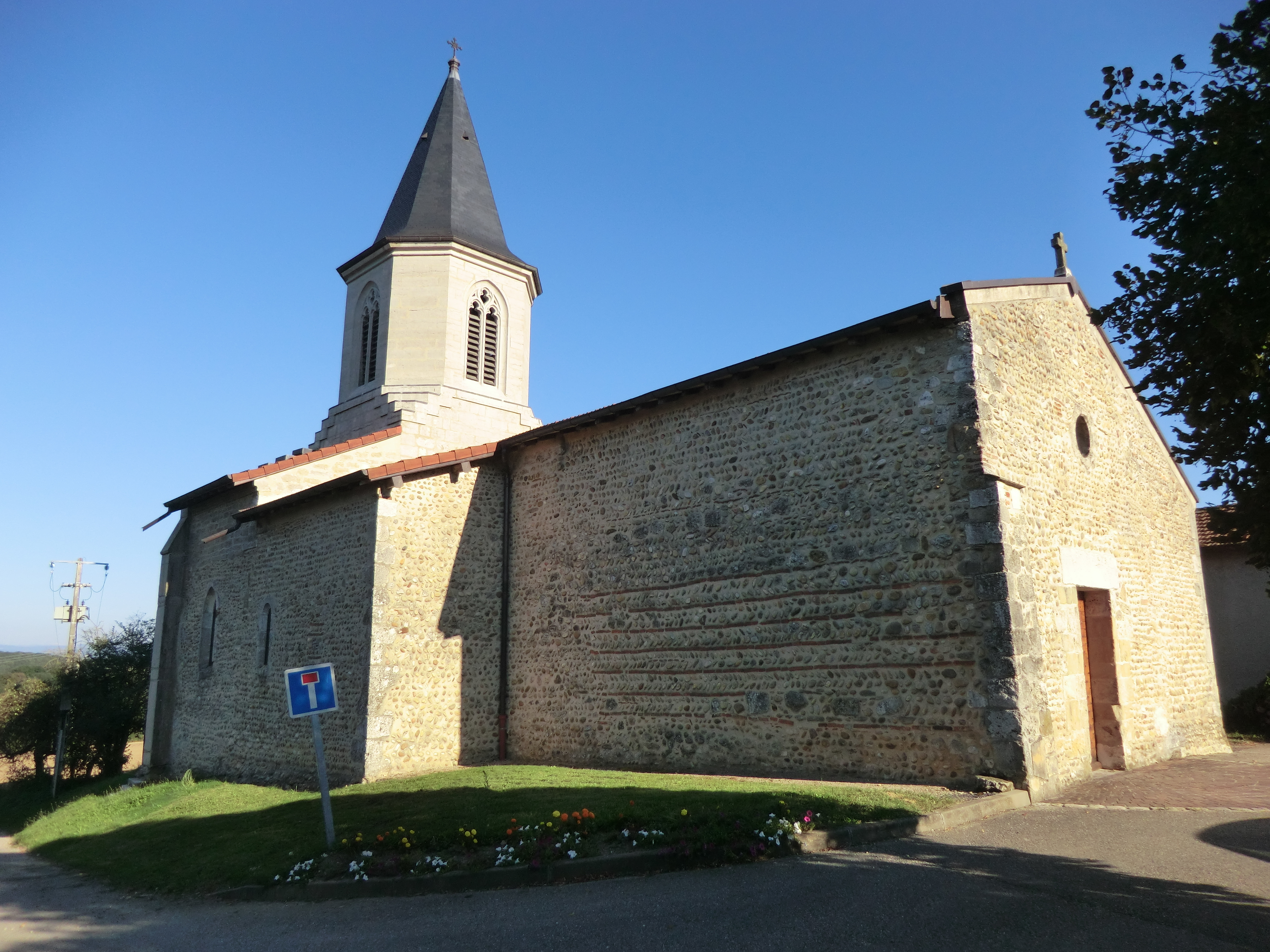
- Location of Saint-Éloi
- Location within France Location within Auvergne-Rhône-Alpes
- Coordinates: 45°56′00″N 5°09′00″E
- Country: France
- Region: Auvergne-Rhône-Alpes
- Department: Ain
- Arrondissement: Belley
- Canton: Meximieux

Government
  - Mayor (2026–32): Franck Stéphane Chapiteau
- Area^{1}: 14 km^{2} (5.4 sq mi)
- Elevation: 290 m (950 ft)
- Highest elevation: 310 m (1,020 ft)
- Lowest elevation: 234 m (768 ft)
- Population (2023): 525
  - Density: 38/km^{2} (97/sq mi)
- Time zone: UTC+01:00 (CET)
  - Summer (DST): UTC+02:00 (CEST)
- INSEE/Postal code: 01349 /01800
- ^{1} French Land Register data, which excludes lakes, ponds, glaciers > 1 km^{2} (0.386 sq mi or 247 acres) and river estuaries.

Saint-Éloi (French pronunciation: [sɛ̃.t‿elwa]) is a commune in the Ain department in eastern France.

== Population ==
Historical population
Year	Pop.	±% p.a.
1968	170	—
1975	155	−1.31%
1982	243	+6.63%
1990	358	+4.96%
1999	402	+1.30%
2007	386	−0.51%
2012	440	+2.65%
2017	456	+0.72%
2023	525	+2.38%
Source: INSEE

== See also ==
- Communes of the Ain department
