= Faramans, Ain =

Commune in Auvergne-Rhône-Alpes, France

Faramans
- Commune
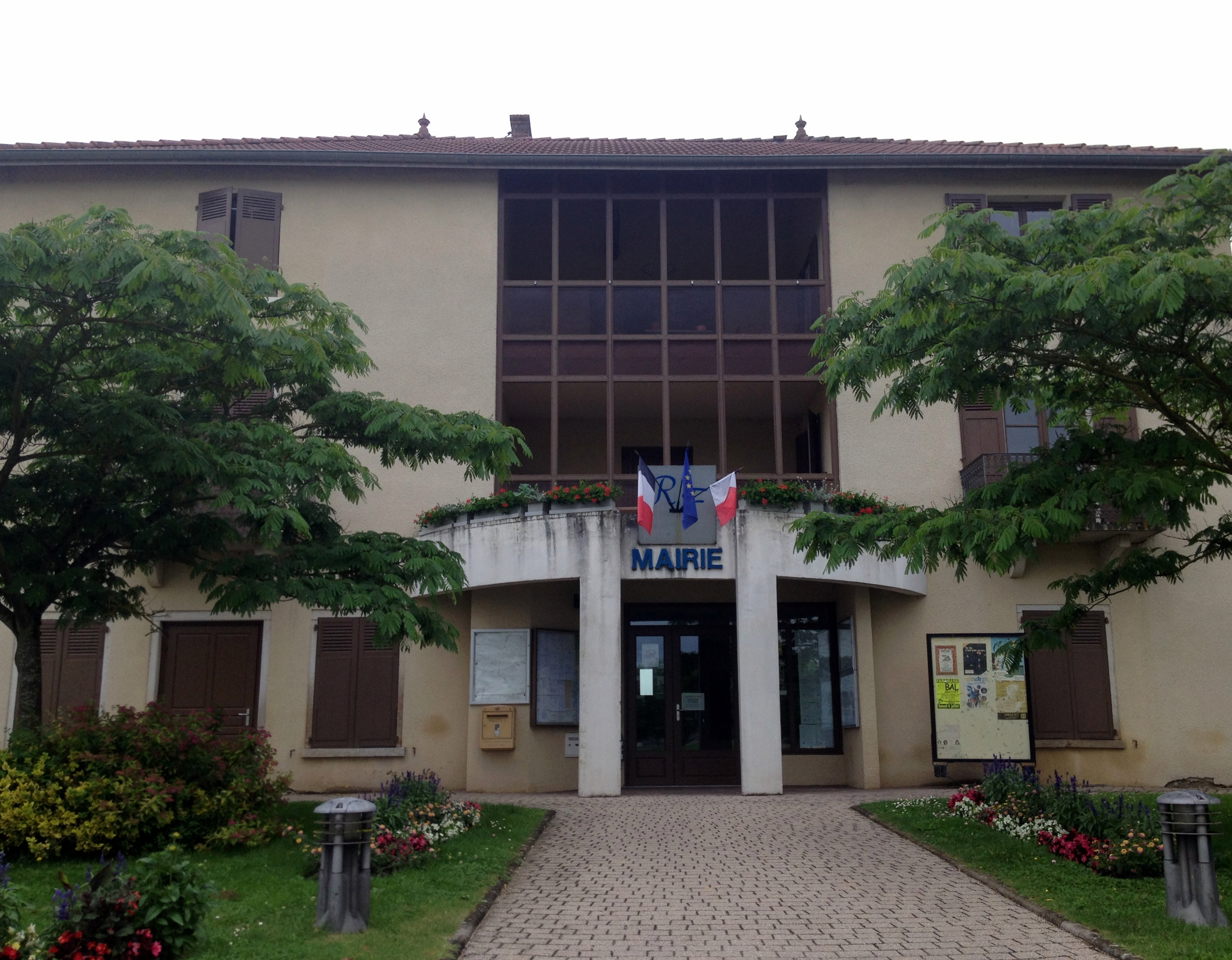
- Town hall

- Coat of arms
- Location of Faramans
- Location within France Location within Auvergne-Rhône-Alpes
- Coordinates: 45°54′00″N 5°07′00″E
- Country: France
- Region: Auvergne-Rhône-Alpes
- Department: Ain
- Arrondissement: Belley
- Canton: Meximieux
- Intercommunality: Plaine de l'Ain

Government
  - Mayor (2026–32): Gérard Brochier
- Area^{1}: 11.22 km^{2} (4.33 sq mi)
- Elevation: 276 m (906 ft)
- Highest elevation: 306 m (1,004 ft)
- Lowest elevation: 255 m (837 ft)
- Population (2023): 934
  - Density: 83.2/km^{2} (216/sq mi)
- Time zone: UTC+01:00 (CET)
  - Summer (DST): UTC+02:00 (CEST)
- INSEE/Postal code: 01156 /01800
- ^{1} French Land Register data, which excludes lakes, ponds, glaciers > 1 km^{2} (0.386 sq mi or 247 acres) and river estuaries.

Faramans (French pronunciation: [faʁamɑ̃]) is a commune in the Ain department in eastern France.

== Population ==
Historical population
Year	Pop.	±% p.a.
1968	283	—
1975	315	+1.54%
1982	388	+3.02%
1990	482	+2.75%
1999	592	+2.31%
2007	641	+1.00%
2012	742	+2.97%
2017	806	+1.67%
2023	934	+2.49%
Source: INSEE

== See also ==
- Communes of the Ain department
