= Côtière =

Natural region in French department of Ain

Coordinates: 45.833105°N 5.026245°E

Côtière in department of Ain

Côtière or Côtière de l'Ain is a natural region located southwest of the department of Ain, France. It is along a slope of about forty kilometers, beginning with the balcony of Croix-Rousse and ending in Meximieux.

The main cities are Miribel, Montluel and Meximieux. Pérouges is member of Les Plus Beaux Villages de France.

== Bibliography ==
- Sceau, Richard (1981). "La Côtière d'Ain". Géocarrefour. 56 (4): 435–445. doi:10.3406/geoca.1981.3964.

== See also ==
- Bugey-Côtière (Newspaper)
