= Bugey-Côtière =

Newspaper of France

- Type: Weekly newspaper
- Founded: 2019
- Ceased publication: 2023
- Language: French
- Headquarters: Montluel, Ambérieu-en-Bugey
- ISSN: 2678-534X

Bugey-Côtière formerly respectively Le Journal de la Côtière and Le Journal du Bugey was a French weekly newspaper, dedicated to the news of the Côtière and (part of) Bugey, in Ain in France.

In 2019, Bugey-Côtière is the result of the merge of Le Journal de la Côtière and Le Journal du Bugey. Using the numbering of Le Journal de la Côtière, number 1,200 was reached in July 2019.

In September 2023, the number 1401 of Bugey-Côtière is the last number of that publication.
