= Canton of Meximieux =

Coordinates: 45°54′19″N 5°11′43″E

Meximieux
- Canton
- Interactive map of Meximieux
- Country: France
- Region: Auvergne-Rhône-Alpes
- Department: Ain
- No. of communes: {{{nbcomm}}}
- Area: 218.68 km^{2} (84.43 sq mi)
- Population (2023): 35,227
  - Density: 161.09/km^{2} (417.22/sq mi)
- INSEE code: 01 12

The canton of Meximieux is an administrative division in eastern France. At the French canton reorganisation which came into effect in March 2015, the canton was expanded from 12 to 15 communes:

1. Balan
2. Béligneux
3. Bourg-Saint-Christophe
4. Bressolles
5. Dagneux
6. Faramans
7. Joyeux
8. Meximieux
9. Le Montellier
10. Montluel
11. Pérouges
12. Pizay
13. Rignieux-le-Franc
14. Sainte-Croix
15. Saint-Éloi

== Demographics ==
Historical population
Year	Pop.	±% p.a.
2013	32,208	—
2018	33,254	+0.64%
Source: INSEE

== See also ==
- Cantons of the Ain department
- Communes of France
