= Béligneux =

Commune in Auvergne-Rhône-Alpes, France

- Commune
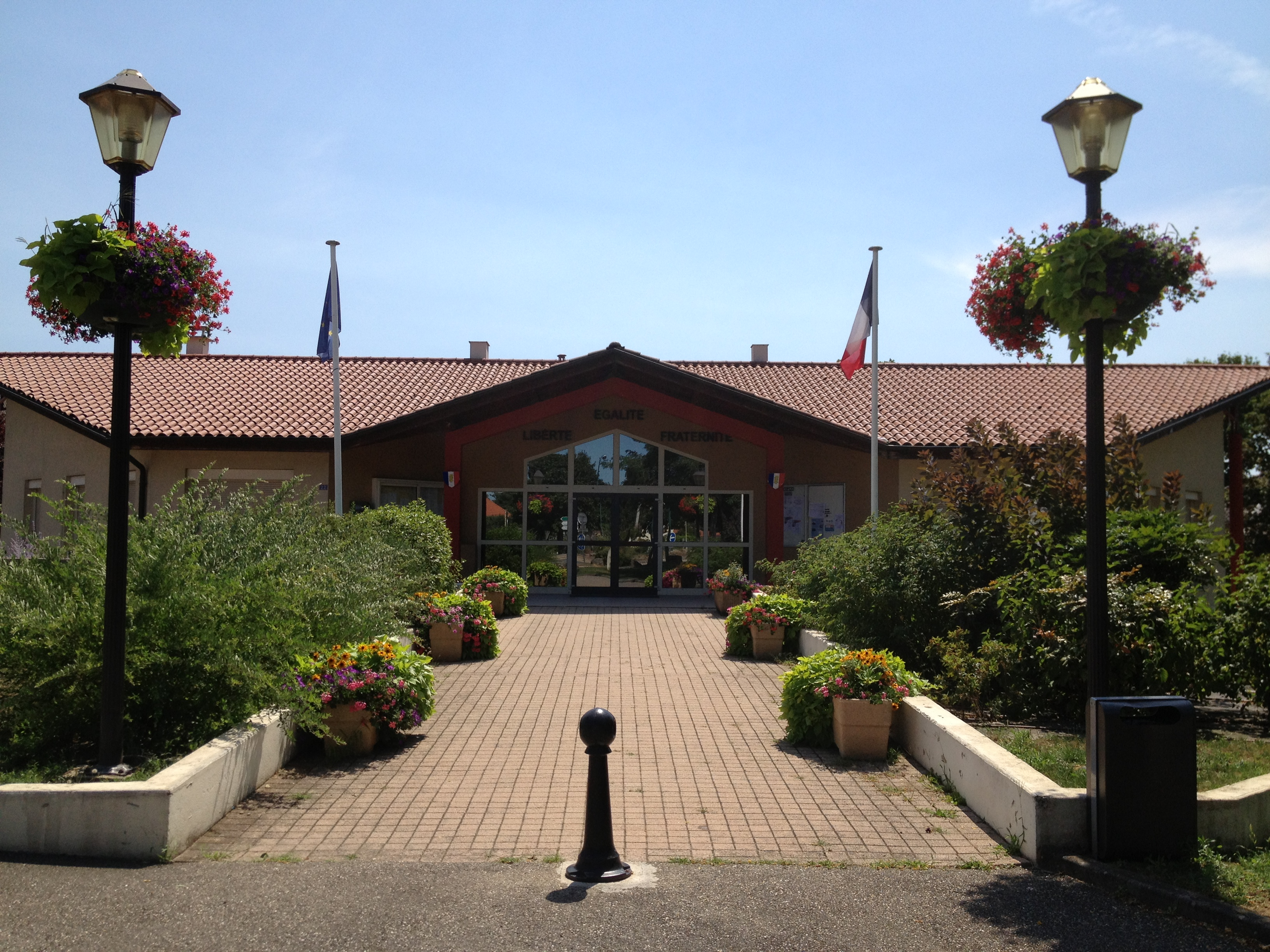
- Town hall

- Coat of arms
- Location of Béligneux
- Location within France Location within Auvergne-Rhône-Alpes
- Coordinates: 45°52′00″N 5°07′00″E
- Country: France
- Region: Auvergne-Rhône-Alpes
- Department: Ain
- Arrondissement: Bourg-en-Bresse
- Canton: Meximieux
- Intercommunality: La Côtière à Montluel

Government
  - Mayor (2026–32): Philippe Ferrand
- Area^{1}: 13.30 km^{2} (5.14 sq mi)
- Elevation: 260 m (850 ft)
- Highest elevation: 275 m (902 ft)
- Lowest elevation: 210 m (690 ft)
- Population (2023): 3,535
  - Density: 265.8/km^{2} (688.4/sq mi)
- Time zone: UTC+01:00 (CET)
  - Summer (DST): UTC+02:00 (CEST)
- INSEE/Postal code: 01032 /01360
- Website: https://www.ville-beligneux.fr/
- ^{1} French Land Register data, which excludes lakes, ponds, glaciers > 1 km^{2} (0.386 sq mi or 247 acres) and river estuaries.

Béligneux (French pronunciation: [beliɲø]) is a commune in the Ain department in central-eastern France.

== Geography ==
It lies about 30 km northeast of Lyon. The commune includes part of the village of La Valbonne at the foot of the hill (the rest belongs to the neighboring commune of Balan) and the hamlet of Chânes.

== Population ==
Historical population
Year	Pop.	±% p.a.
1968	1,022	—
1975	1,341	+3.96%
1982	1,486	+1.48%
1990	2,319	+5.72%
1999	2,594	+1.25%
2007	2,851	+1.19%
2012	3,172	+2.16%
2017	3,333	+1.00%
2023	3,535	+0.99%
Source: INSEE

== See also ==
- Communes of the Ain department
