= Le Montellier =

Commune in Auvergne-Rhône-Alpes, France

- Commune
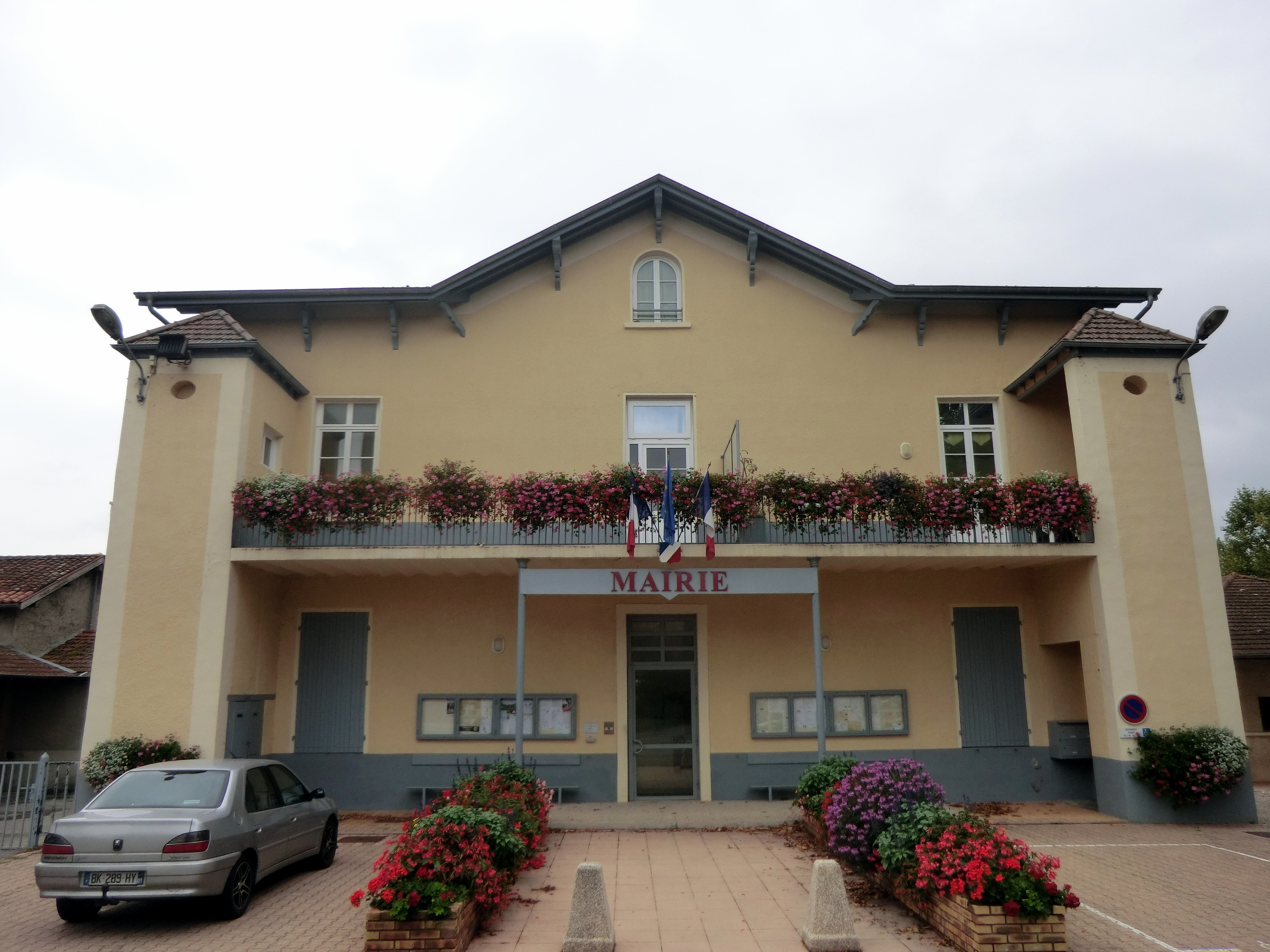
- Town hall
- Location of Le Montellier
- Location within France Location within Auvergne-Rhône-Alpes
- Coordinates: 45°56′00″N 5°04′00″E
- Country: France
- Region: Auvergne-Rhône-Alpes
- Department: Ain
- Arrondissement: Belley
- Canton: Meximieux
- Intercommunality: Plaine de l'Ain

Government
  - Mayor (2026–32): Patrice Martin
- Area^{1}: 15.4 km^{2} (5.9 sq mi)
- Elevation: 290 m (950 ft)
- Highest elevation: 297 m (974 ft)
- Lowest elevation: 267 m (876 ft)
- Population (2023): 336
  - Density: 21.8/km^{2} (56.5/sq mi)
- Time zone: UTC+01:00 (CET)
  - Summer (DST): UTC+02:00 (CEST)
- INSEE/Postal code: 01260 /01800
- ^{1} French Land Register data, which excludes lakes, ponds, glaciers > 1 km^{2} (0.386 sq mi or 247 acres) and river estuaries.

Le Montellier (French pronunciation: [lə mɔ̃təlje]) is a commune in the Ain department in eastern France.

== Population ==
Historical population
Year	Pop.	±% p.a.
1968	166	—
1975	141	−2.30%
1982	161	+1.91%
1990	170	+0.68%
1999	221	+2.96%
2007	213	−0.46%
2012	241	+2.50%
2017	297	+4.27%
2023	336	+2.08%
Source: INSEE

== See also ==
- Communes of the Ain department
