= Bressolles, Ain =

Commune in Auvergne-Rhône-Alpes, France

Bressolles
- Commune
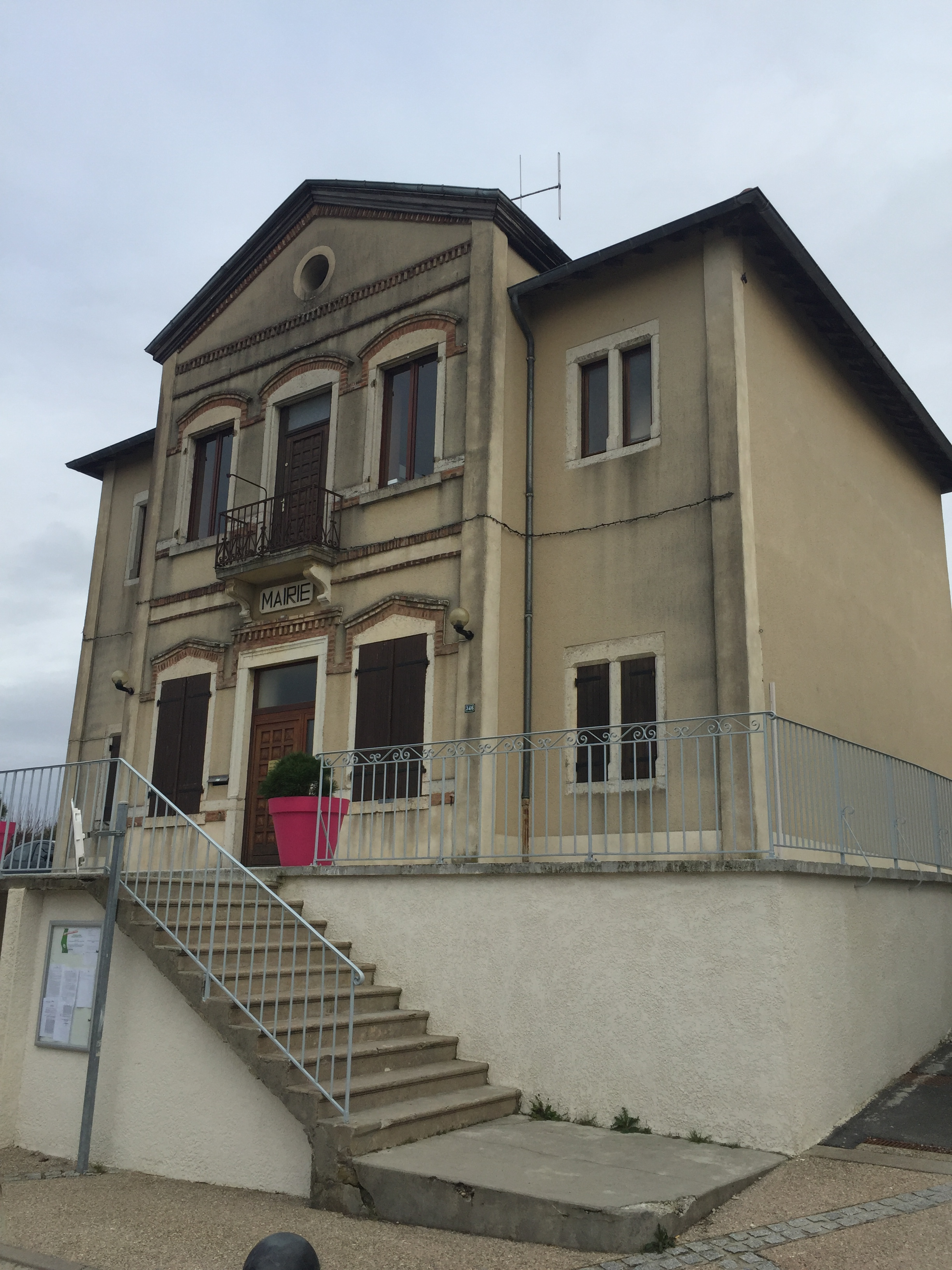
- Town hall

- Coat of arms
- Location of Bressolles
- Location within France Location within Auvergne-Rhône-Alpes
- Coordinates: 45°52′00″N 5°06′00″E
- Country: France
- Region: Auvergne-Rhône-Alpes
- Department: Ain
- Arrondissement: Bourg-en-Bresse
- Canton: Meximieux
- Intercommunality: La Côtière à Montluel

Government
  - Mayor (2026–32): Christian Gouverneur
- Area^{1}: 7.93 km^{2} (3.06 sq mi)
- Elevation: 269 m (883 ft)
- Highest elevation: 292 m (958 ft)
- Lowest elevation: 205 m (673 ft)
- Population (2023): 1,028
  - Density: 130/km^{2} (336/sq mi)
- Time zone: UTC+01:00 (CET)
  - Summer (DST): UTC+02:00 (CEST)
- INSEE/Postal code: 01062 /01360
- Website: https://www.ville-bressolles.fr/
- ^{1} French Land Register data, which excludes lakes, ponds, glaciers > 1 km^{2} (0.386 sq mi or 247 acres) and river estuaries.

Bressolles (French pronunciation: [bʁesɔl]; Arpitan: Bréssôla) is a commune in the Ain department in central-eastern France.

== Population ==
Historical population
Year	Pop.	±% p.a.
1968	252	—
1975	270	+0.99%
1982	446	+7.43%
1990	480	+0.92%
1999	590	+2.32%
2007	703	+2.21%
2012	777	+2.02%
2017	911	+3.23%
2023	1,028	+2.03%
Source: INSEE

== See also ==
- Communes of the Ain department
