= Pizay =

Commune in Auvergne-Rhône-Alpes, France

- Commune
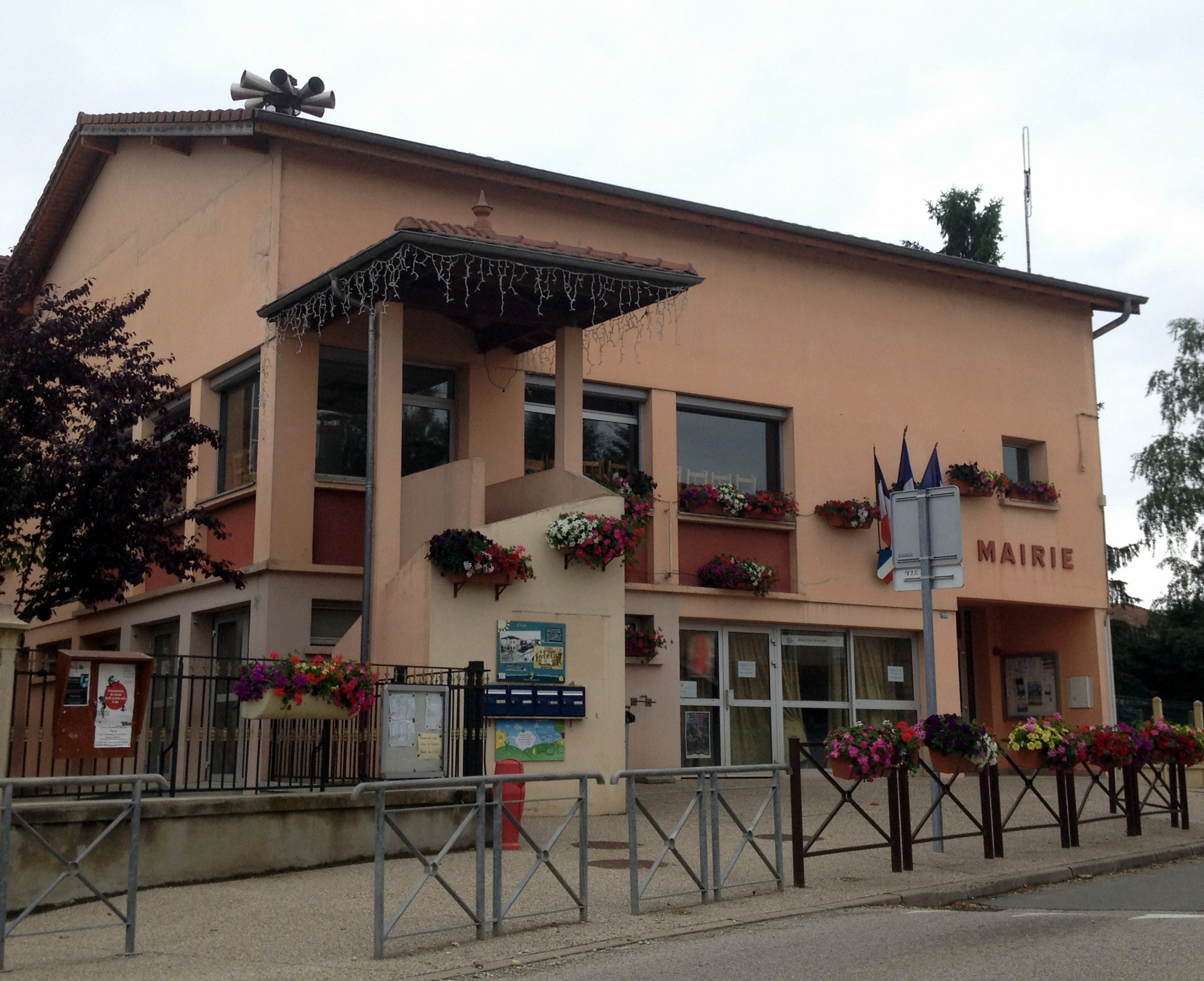
- Town hall

- Coat of arms
- Location of Pizay
- Location within France Location within Auvergne-Rhône-Alpes
- Coordinates: 45°53′00″N 5°05′00″E
- Country: France
- Region: Auvergne-Rhône-Alpes
- Department: Ain
- Arrondissement: Bourg-en-Bresse
- Canton: Meximieux
- Intercommunality: La Côtière à Montluel

Government
  - Mayor (2026–32): Marc Grimand
- Area^{1}: 11.18 km^{2} (4.32 sq mi)
- Elevation: 285 m (935 ft)
- Highest elevation: 294 m (965 ft)
- Lowest elevation: 217 m (712 ft)
- Population (2023): 937
  - Density: 83.8/km^{2} (217/sq mi)
- Time zone: UTC+01:00 (CET)
  - Summer (DST): UTC+02:00 (CEST)
- INSEE/Postal code: 01297 /01120
- ^{1} French Land Register data, which excludes lakes, ponds, glaciers > 1 km^{2} (0.386 sq mi or 247 acres) and river estuaries.

Pizay (French pronunciation: [pizɛ]; Arpitan: Pesê) is a commune in the Ain department in eastern France.

== Population ==
Historical population
Year	Pop.	±% p.a.
1968	237	—
1975	319	+4.34%
1982	379	+2.49%
1990	433	+1.68%
1999	637	+4.38%
2007	750	+2.06%
2012	770	+0.53%
2017	820	+1.27%
2023	937	+2.25%
Source: INSEE

== See also ==
- Communes of the Ain department
