= Dagneux =

Commune in Auvergne-Rhône-Alpes, France

- Commune
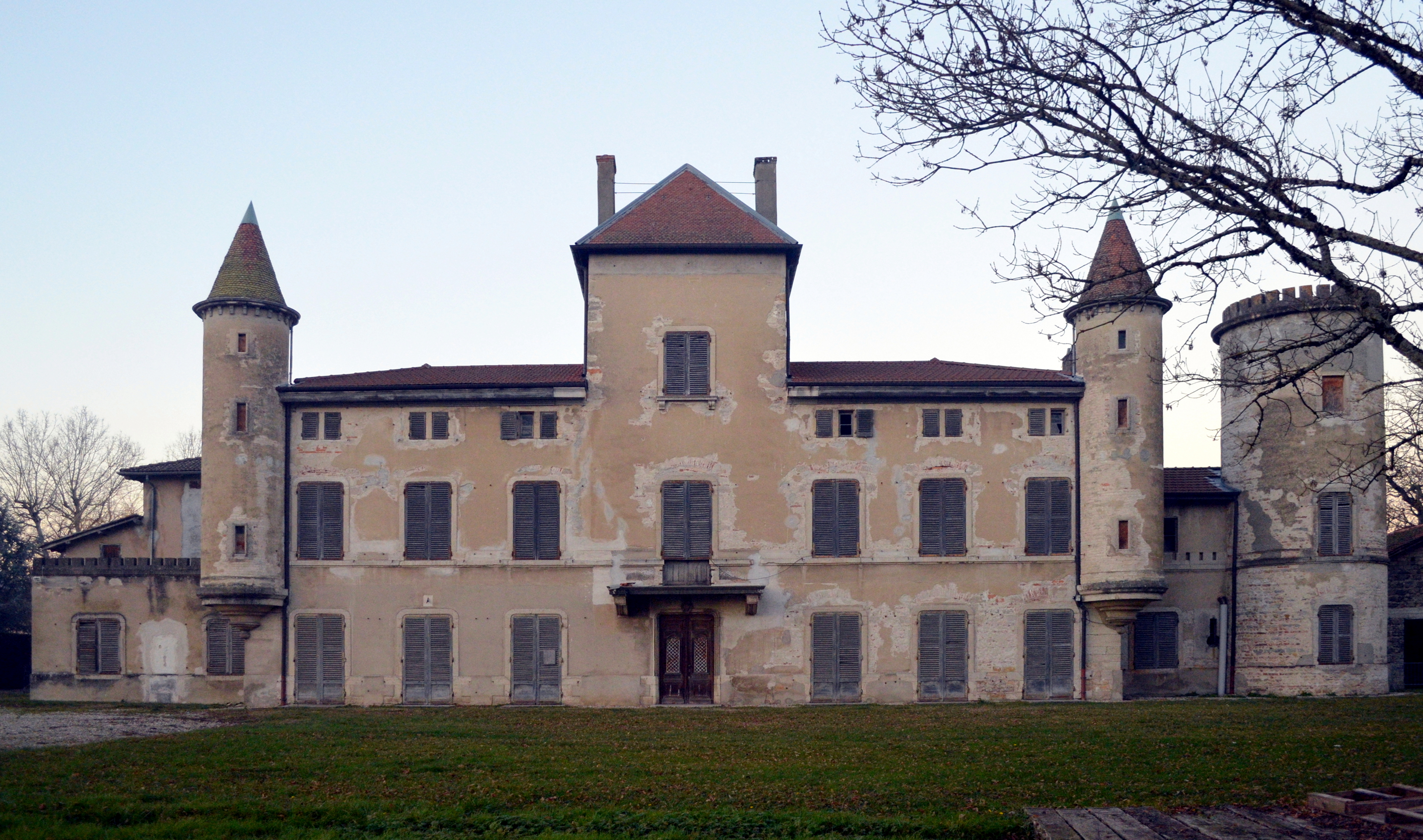
- Chateau Chiloup

- Coat of arms
- Location of Dagneux
- Location within France Location within Auvergne-Rhône-Alpes
- Coordinates: 45°51′03″N 5°04′31″E
- Country: France
- Region: Auvergne-Rhône-Alpes
- Department: Ain
- Arrondissement: Bourg-en-Bresse
- Canton: Meximieux
- Intercommunality: Côtière à Montluel

Government
  - Mayor (2026–32): Jean-Christophe Péguet
- Area^{1}: 6.65 km^{2} (2.57 sq mi)
- Elevation: 198 m (650 ft)
- Highest elevation: 285 m (935 ft)
- Lowest elevation: 189 m (620 ft)
- Population (2023): 4,778
  - Density: 718/km^{2} (1,860/sq mi)
- Time zone: UTC+01:00 (CET)
  - Summer (DST): UTC+02:00 (CEST)
- INSEE/Postal code: 01142 /01120
- ^{1} French Land Register data, which excludes lakes, ponds, glaciers > 1 km^{2} (0.386 sq mi or 247 acres) and river estuaries.

Dagneux (French pronunciation: [daɲø]; Arpitan: Dagniô) is a commune in the Ain department in eastern France.

== Population ==
Historical population
Year	Pop.	±% p.a.
1968	1,372	—
1975	1,817	+4.09%
1982	2,091	+2.03%
1990	3,317	+5.94%
1999	3,757	+1.39%
2007	3,890	+0.44%
2012	4,169	+1.39%
2017	4,717	+2.50%
2023	4,778	+0.21%
Source: INSEE

== See also ==
- Communes of the Ain department
