= Sainte-Croix, Ain =

Commune in Auvergne-Rhône-Alpes, France

Sainte-Croix
- Commune
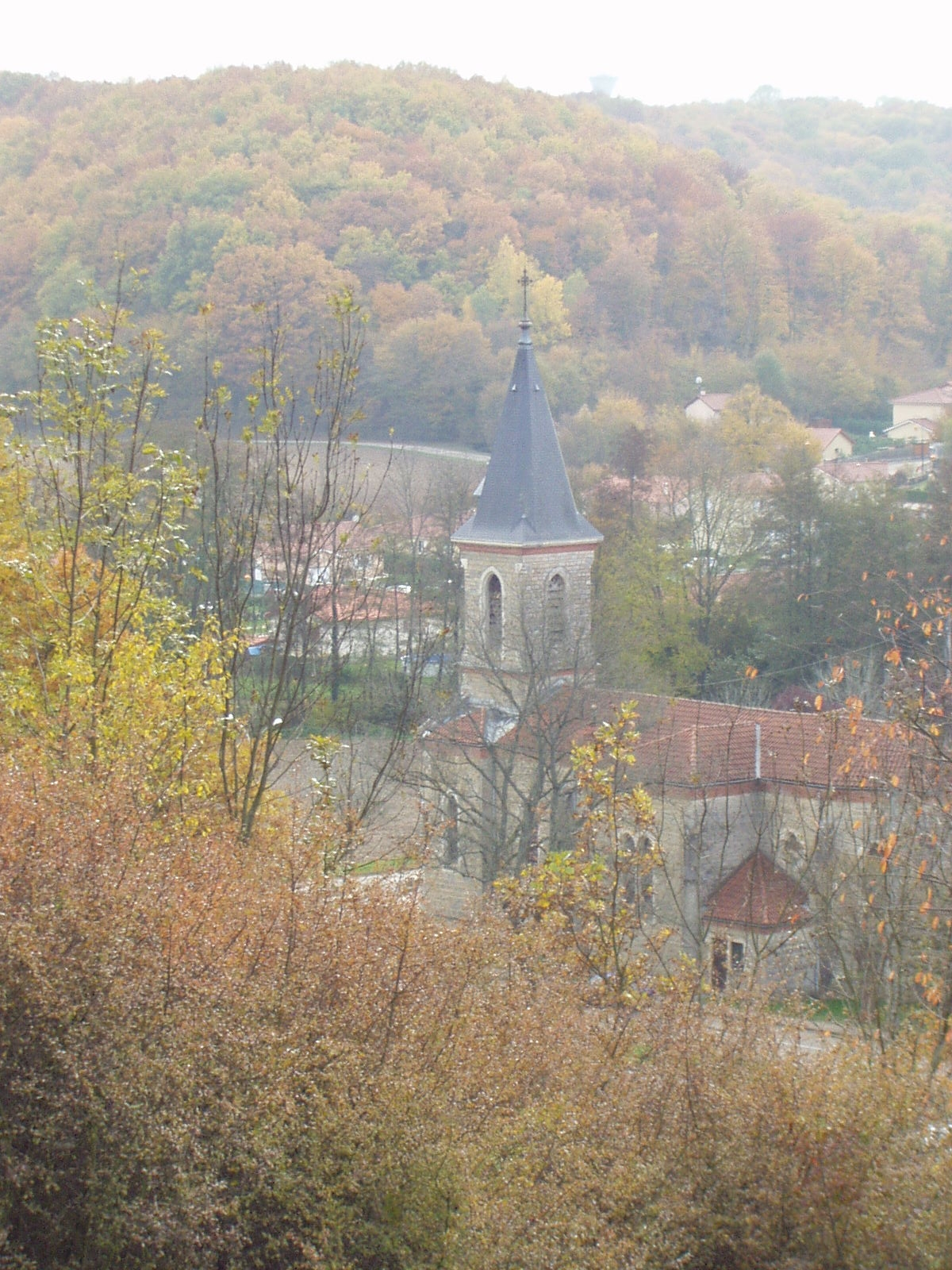

- Coat of arms
- Location of Sainte-Croix
- Location within France Location within Auvergne-Rhône-Alpes
- Coordinates: 45°53′40″N 5°03′12″E
- Country: France
- Region: Auvergne-Rhône-Alpes
- Department: Ain
- Arrondissement: Bourg-en-Bresse
- Canton: Meximieux
- Intercommunality: La Côtière à Montluel

Government
  - Mayor (2026–32): Sylvie Genevois Meitre
- Area^{1}: 10.62 km^{2} (4.10 sq mi)
- Highest elevation: 294 m (965 ft)
- Lowest elevation: 235 m (771 ft)
- Population (2023): 544
  - Density: 51.2/km^{2} (133/sq mi)
- Time zone: UTC+01:00 (CET)
  - Summer (DST): UTC+02:00 (CEST)
- INSEE/Postal code: 01342 /01120
- ^{1} French Land Register data, which excludes lakes, ponds, glaciers > 1 km^{2} (0.386 sq mi or 247 acres) and river estuaries.

Sainte-Croix (French pronunciation: [sɛ̃t kʁwa]; Arpitan: Sent-Crouèx or Senta-Crouèx) is a commune in the Ain department in eastern France.

== Population ==
Historical population
| Year | Pop. | ±% p.a. |
|---|---|---|
| 1968 | 176 | — |
| 1975 | 169 | −0.58% |
| 1982 | 263 | +6.52% |
| 1990 | 365 | +4.18% |
| 1999 | 468 | +2.80% |
| 2007 | 520 | +1.33% |
| 2012 | 523 | +0.12% |
| 2017 | 570 | +1.74% |
| 2023 | 544 | −0.78% |
Source: INSEE

== See also ==
- Communes of the Ain department
