= Pérouges =

Commune in Auvergne-Rhône-Alpes, France

Pérouges Pèrôges (Arpitan)
- Commune
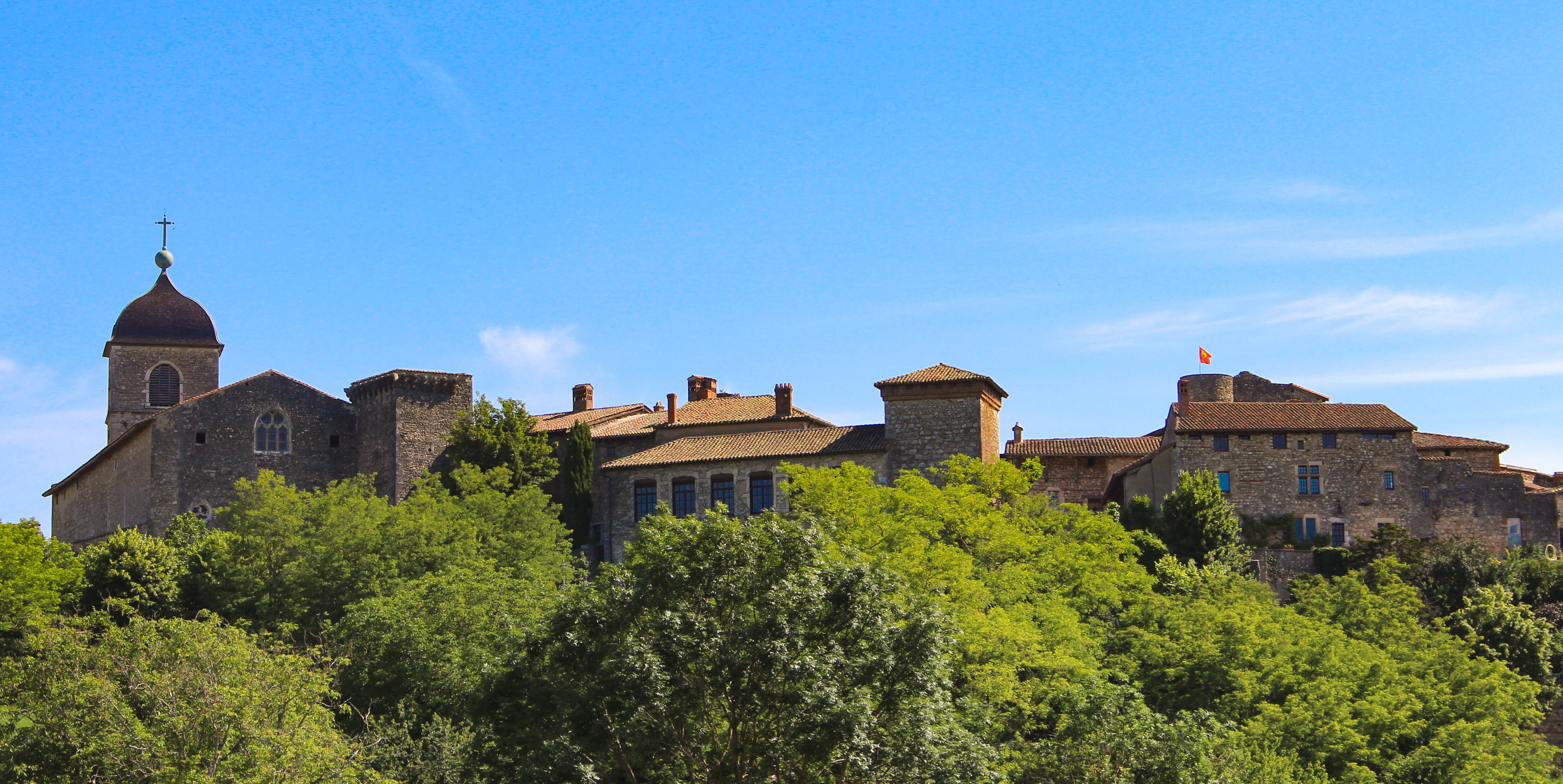
- A view of Pérouges

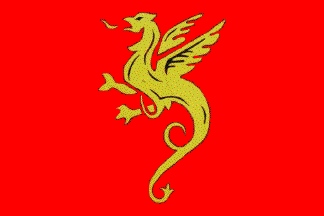
- Flag Coat of arms
- Location of Pérouges
- Location within France Location within Auvergne-Rhône-Alpes
- Coordinates: 45°54′26″N 5°10′22″E
- Country: France
- Region: Auvergne-Rhône-Alpes
- Department: Ain
- Arrondissement: Belley
- Canton: Meximieux

Government
  - Mayor (2026–32): Nathalie Micolas
- Area^{1}: 18.97 km^{2} (7.32 sq mi)
- Elevation: 270 m (890 ft)
- Highest elevation: 303 m (994 ft)
- Lowest elevation: 205 m (673 ft)
- Population (2023): 1,387
  - Density: 73.12/km^{2} (189.4/sq mi)
- Time zone: UTC+01:00 (CET)
  - Summer (DST): UTC+02:00 (CEST)
- INSEE/Postal code: 01290 /01800
- ^{1} French Land Register data, which excludes lakes, ponds, glaciers > 1 km^{2} (0.386 sq mi or 247 acres) and river estuaries.

Pérouges (French pronunciation: [peʁuʒ]; Arpitan: Pèrôges) is a commune in the Ain department in the Auvergne-Rhône-Alpes region in Eastern France. A medieval walled town perched on a small hill that overlooks the plain of the river Ain, it is located 30 km (19 mi) northeast of Lyon, historically in the neighbouring Rhône department.

== History ==
Pérouges was inhabited by craftsmen; mainly farmers and linen weavers. It was probably founded by a Gallic colony returning from Perugia in Italy. In 1167, the Seigneur d'Anthon famously shut the commune's walls against the troops of the Archbishop of Lyon, and as early as 1236 the inhabitants earned communal freedom. In 1601 the town officially became French. Until the end of the 18th century, the textile industry in Pérouges boomed. In the 19th century, however, roads and railroads were re-routed and the population dropped from 1,500 to 90. But, starting in 1911, the town was restored and houses were saved. Today, Pérouges is a popular tourist attraction, recognized as one of the Les Plus Beaux Villages de France.

== Origin ==
According to the archaeological findings, humans have been present at Pérouges since the Chalcolithic (about –2500 to –1800) age. There is no date for the construction of the fortress itself, but its first written mention appears in 12th century, therefore it is assumed to be built in that period. Although the town has been attacked by French soldiers on multiple occasions, it still prospered, due to its location and proximity to the trade routes. The town is located between Lyon and Geneva, which was one of the active local trade routes, therefore, craftsmanship and trade in the region flourished. The area officially became part of France under the rule of Henri IV in 1601.

== Demographics ==
Historical population

Year	Pop.	±% p.a.
1793	814	—
1821	873	+0.25%
1846	899	+0.12%
1872	806	−0.42%
1901	538	−1.38%
1926	427	−0.92%
1946	447	+0.23%
1962	474	+0.37%
1968	489	+0.52%

Year	Pop.	±% p.a.
1975	531	+1.18%
1982	658	+3.11%
1990	851	+3.27%
1999	1,103	+2.92%
2007	1,191	+0.96%
2012	1,209	+0.30%
2017	1,201	−0.13%
2023	1,387	+2.43%

Source: EHESS and INSEE (1968-2023)

== Films set in Pérouges ==
Given its authentic historical appearance, Pérouges is often used as the setting for period films by French directors and others.

Films set in Pérouges are:

- Monsieur Vincent (1947)
- The Three Musketeers (1961)
- Mandrin
- Fanfan la Tulipe (1962)
- The Bride (1985)
- The Hour of the Pig (1993)

== Cultural events ==
A spring festival has been held annually between April and June and hosts musical events ranging from Baroque to jazz.

== See also ==
- Communes of the Ain department
