= Balan, Ain =

Commune in Auvergne-Rhône-Alpes, France

Balan
- Commune
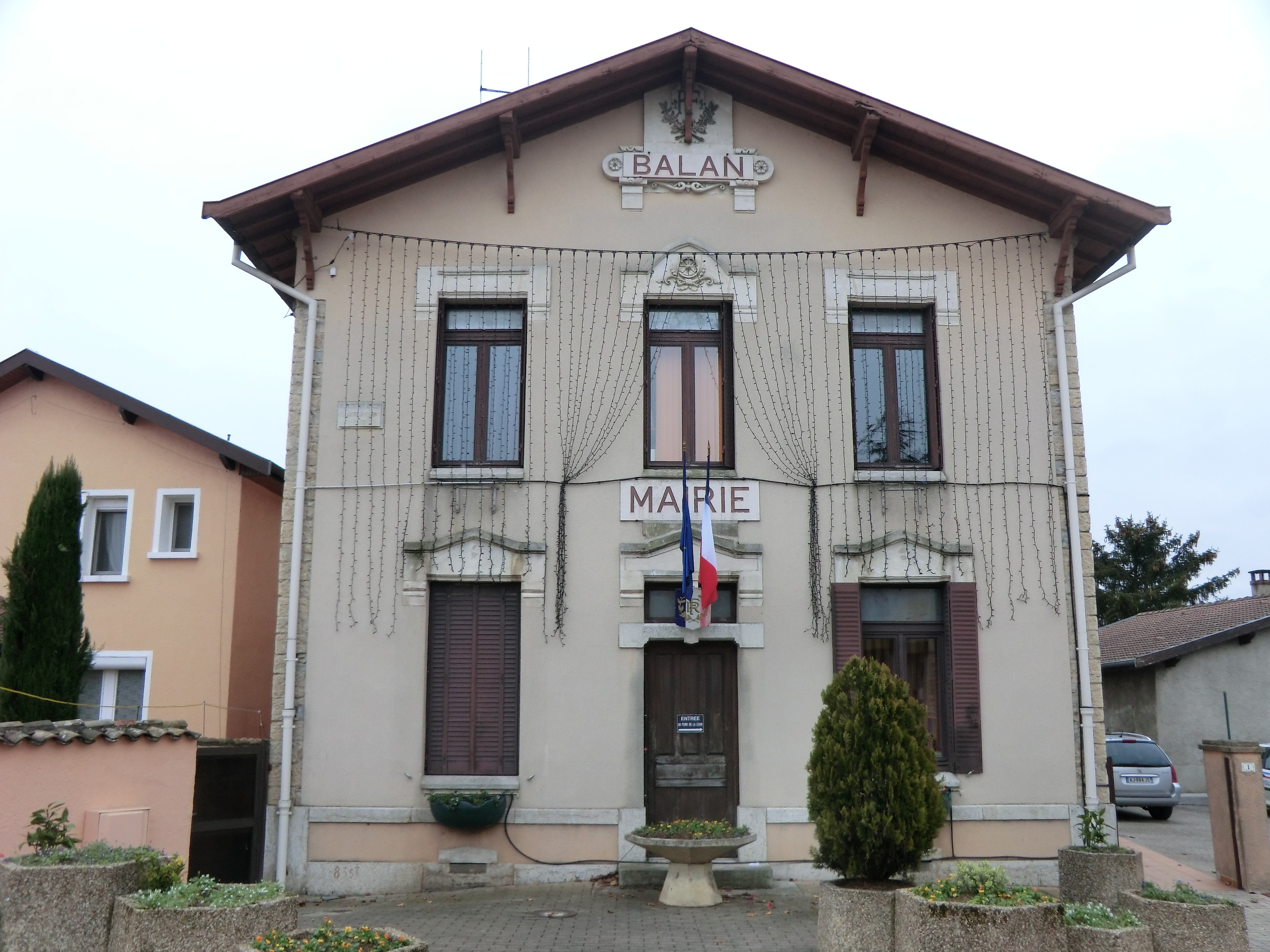
- Town hall

- Coat of arms
- Location of Balan
- Location within France Location within Auvergne-Rhône-Alpes
- Coordinates: 45°50′00″N 5°06′00″E
- Country: France
- Region: Auvergne-Rhône-Alpes
- Department: Ain
- Arrondissement: Bourg-en-Bresse
- Canton: Meximieux
- Intercommunality: La Côtière à Montluel

Government
  - Mayor (2020–2026): Patrick Meant
- Area^{1}: 18.0 km^{2} (6.9 sq mi)
- Elevation: 194 m (636 ft)
- Highest elevation: 233 m (764 ft)
- Lowest elevation: 178 m (584 ft)
- Population (2023): 3,077
  - Density: 171/km^{2} (443/sq mi)
- Time zone: UTC+01:00 (CET)
  - Summer (DST): UTC+02:00 (CEST)
- INSEE/Postal code: 01027 /01700
- Website: https://www.ville-balan.fr/
- ^{1} French Land Register data, which excludes lakes, ponds, glaciers > 1 km^{2} (0.386 sq mi or 247 acres) and river estuaries.

Balan (French pronunciation: [balɑ̃]) is a commune in the Ain department in central-eastern France.

== Population ==
Historical population
Year	Pop.	±% p.a.
1968	732	—
1975	1,051	+5.30%
1982	1,197	+1.88%
1990	1,668	+4.23%
1999	1,534	−0.93%
2007	2,347	+5.46%
2012	2,785	+3.48%
2017	2,684	−0.74%
2023	3,077	+2.30%
Source: INSEE

== See also ==
- Communes of the Ain department
