= Marlieux–Châtillon station =

Railway station in Marlieux, France

Coordinates: 46.0639°N 5.0732°E

Marlieux—Châtillon
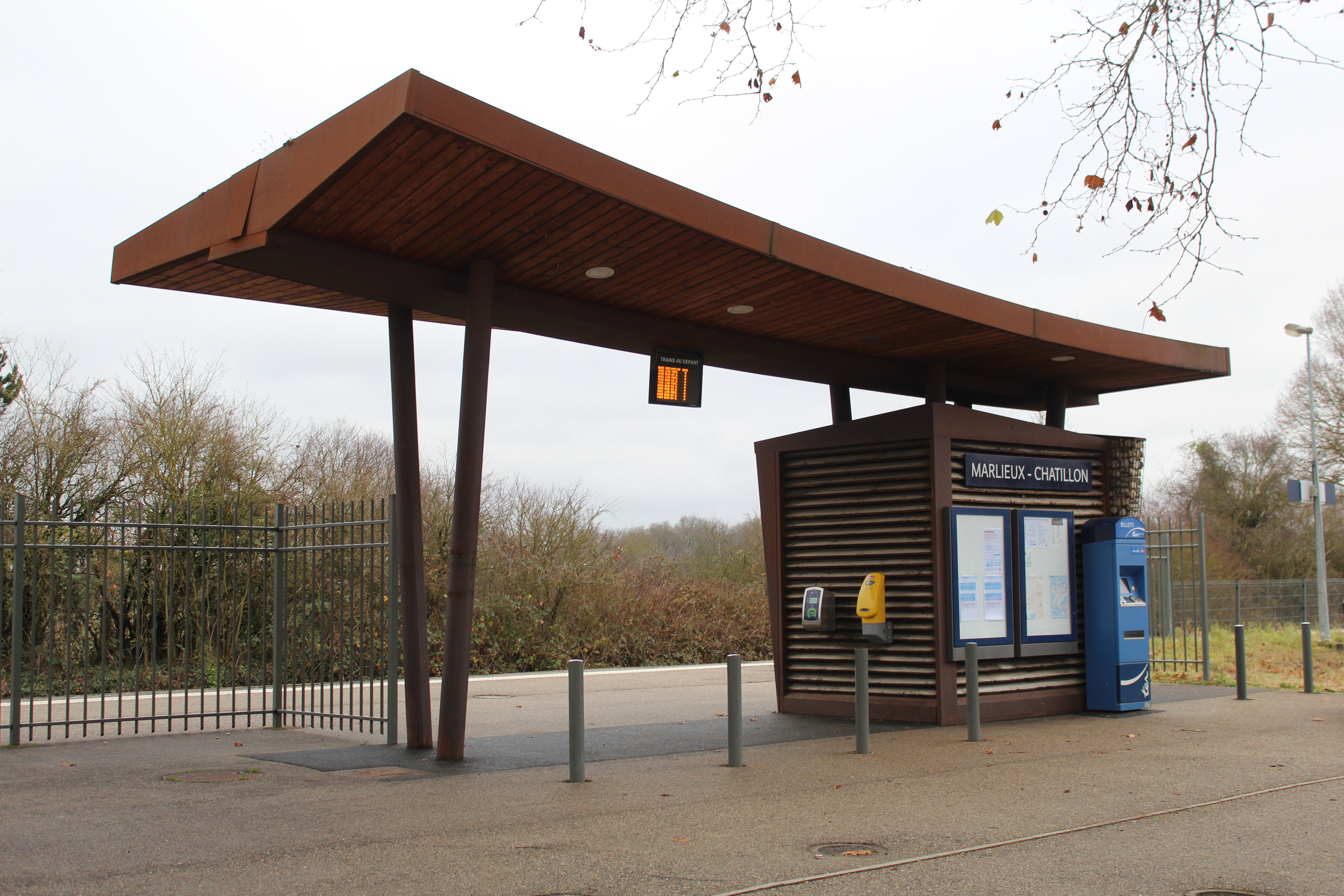
- Entrance to the train halt.

General information
- Location: Point d'arrêt Marlieux—Châtillon; 01240 Marlieux; Ain; France
- Elevation: 270 m (890 ft)
- Owner: SNCF
- Operator: SNCF
- Line: Lyon–Bourg-en-Bresse railway
- Distance: 45.760 km
- Platforms: 1
- Tracks: 1

Other information
- Website: TER website

History
- Opened: 1 September 1866

Passengers
- 2019: 119,224

Services
Preceding station	TER Auvergne-Rhône-Alpes	Following station
Saint-Paul-de-Varax towards Bourg-en-Bresse	32	Villars-les-Dombes towards Lyon-Vaise
Location

Marlieux—Châtillon station (French: Gare de Marlieux—Châtillon) is a French railway station located in the commune of Marlieux, Ain department in the Auvergne-Rhône-Alpes region. As its name suggests the station is located within proximity of, and serves the nearby commune of Châtillon-sur-Chalaronne. It is located at kilometric point (KP) 45.760 on the Lyon–Bourg-en-Bresse railway, between the stations of Villars-les-Dombes and Saint-Paul-de-Varax.

The station was put into service in 1866 by the Compagnie de la Dombes.

As of 2020, the station is owned and operated by the SNCF and served by TER Auvergne-Rhône-Alpes trains.

== History ==
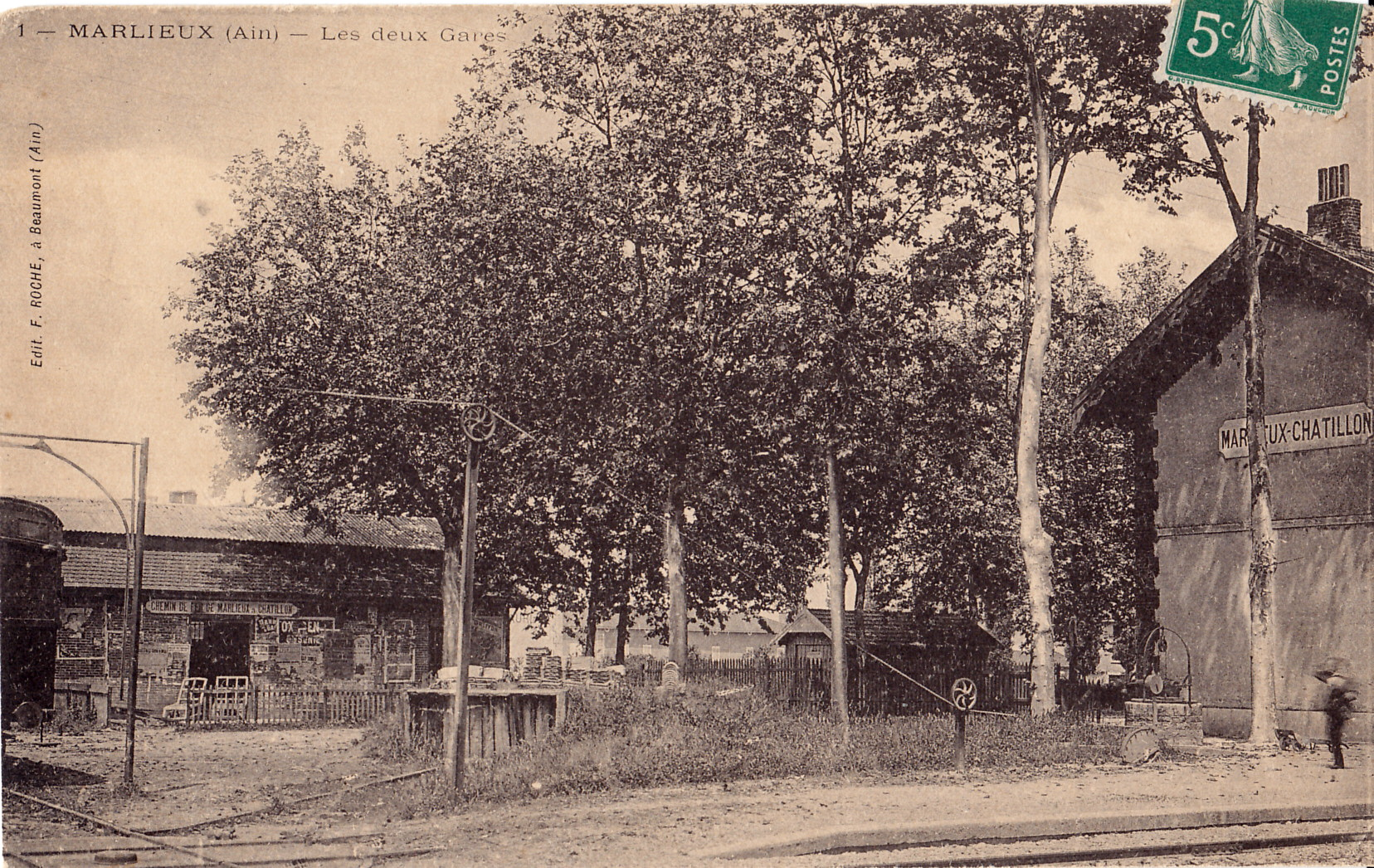
The two railway stations, around 1900.

The "station de Marlieux" was put into service by the Compagnie de la Dombes, on 1 September 1866, along with the opening of railway between Sathonay and Bourg-en-Bresse.

For summer service, beginning 10 May 1869, the station was served by four daily (in each direction) "omnibus mixtes" (passengers and freight) services between Bourg-en-Bresse/Besançon/Mulhouse/Strasbourg and Lyon-Croix-Rousse. On the Bourg-en-Bresse and Lyon-Croix-Rousse service, an addition train was added on Mondays and Wednesdays.

In 1872, the station became part of the Compagnie des Dombes et des chemins de fer du Sud-Est's (DSE) network which substituted its original operator.

In 2019, the SNCF estimated that 119,224 passengers traveled through the station.

=== Historic Marlieux-Châtillon station ===
In 1897, a second station was installed next to the existing station. An exchange station, it was the origin of a secondary metric railway which linked Marlieux and Châtillon-sur-Chalaronne. The department line, with a length of 11.375 km, was operated by the Compagnie du chemin de fer de Marlieux à Châtillon (MC) until 1919 when it was taken over by the Tramways de l'Ain (TA). Trains circulated along the route until 1934.

=== Railway heritage ===
Once removed from service, the historic passenger building was renovated to become the mairie of the commune. It is identical to numerous other passenger buildings constructed along the line by the Compagnie de la Dombes.

== Services ==
=== Passenger services ===
Classified as a PANG (point d'accès non géré), the station is unstaffed and equipped with automatic ticket dispensers.

=== Train services ===
As of 2020, the station is served by the following services:

- Regional services (TER Auvergne-Rhône-Alpes 32) Bourg-en-Bresse ... Lyon.

=== Intermodality ===
In addition to a parking lot for passengers, the station is equipped with secure bicycle storage facilities.

Station installations.

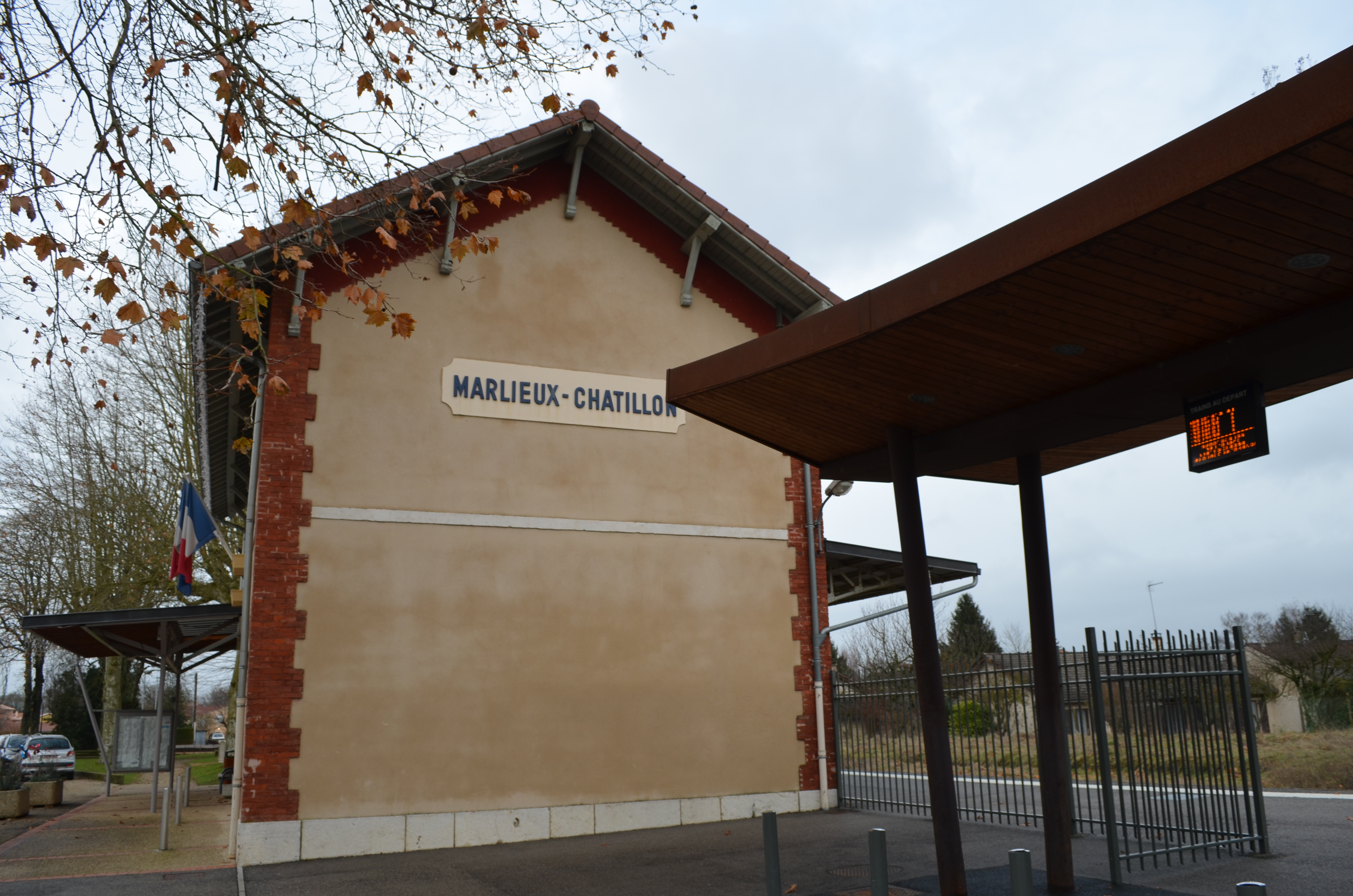
Station entrance.

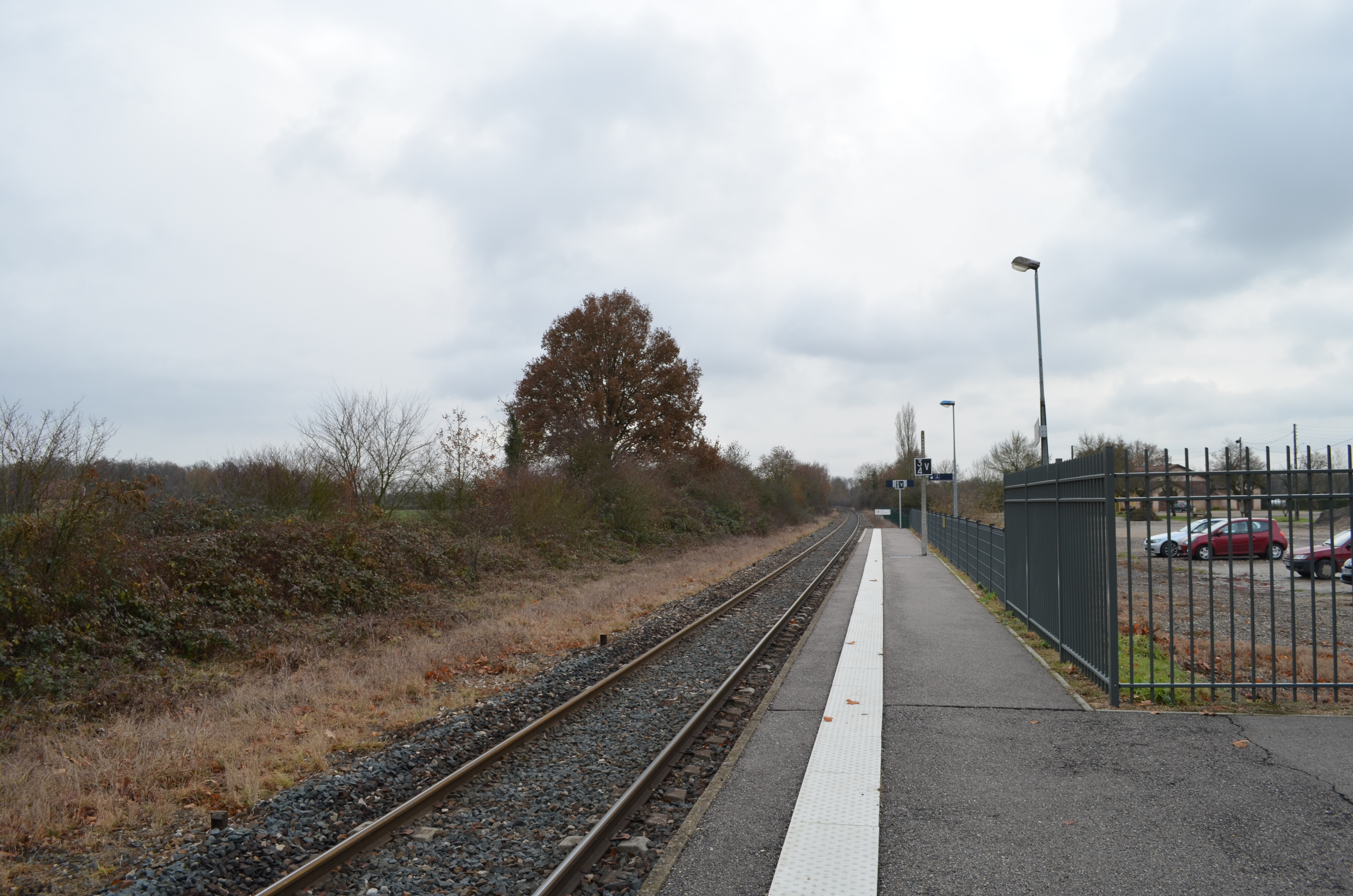
Station platform and track.

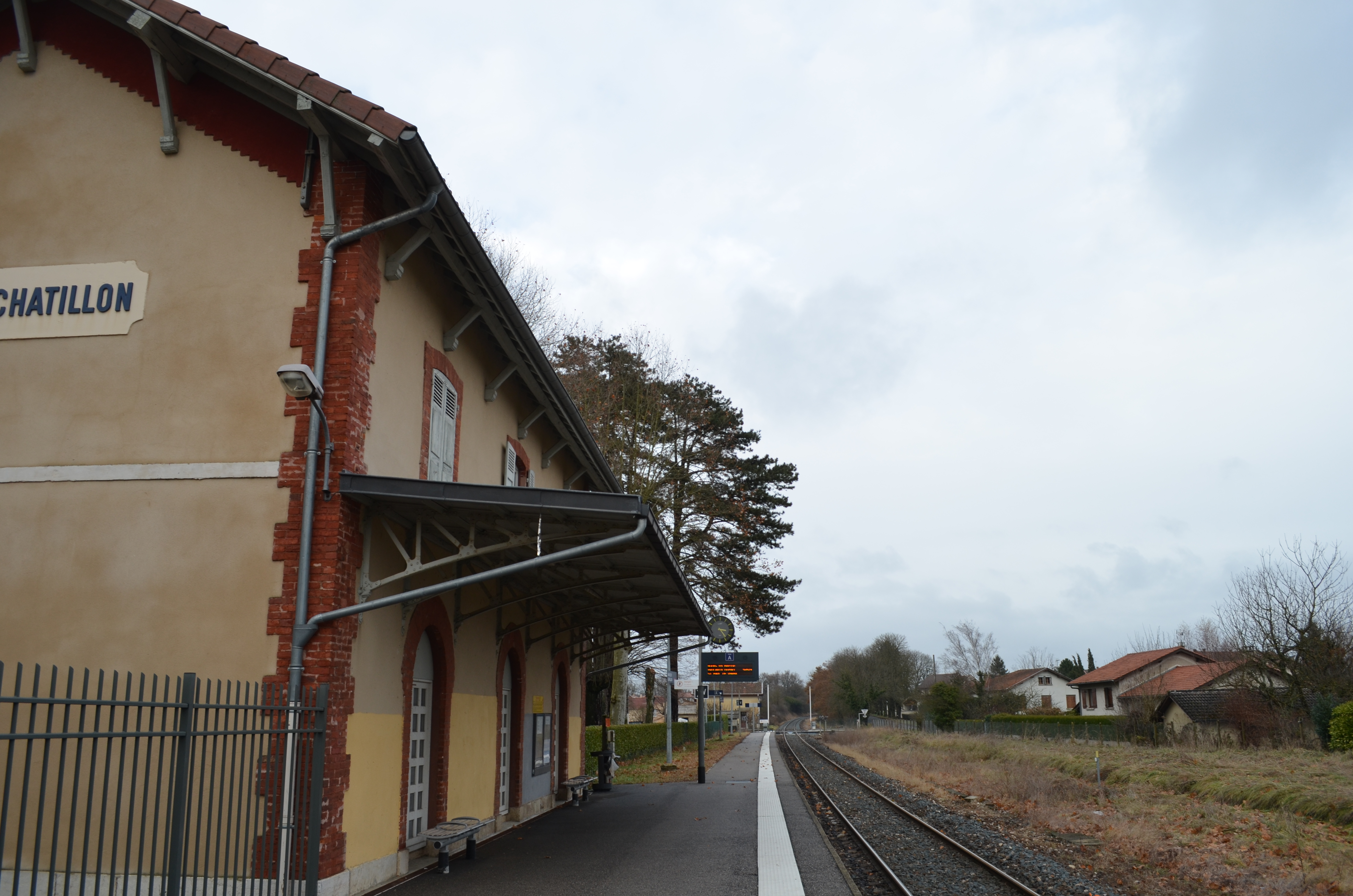
Station platform and historic passenger building.

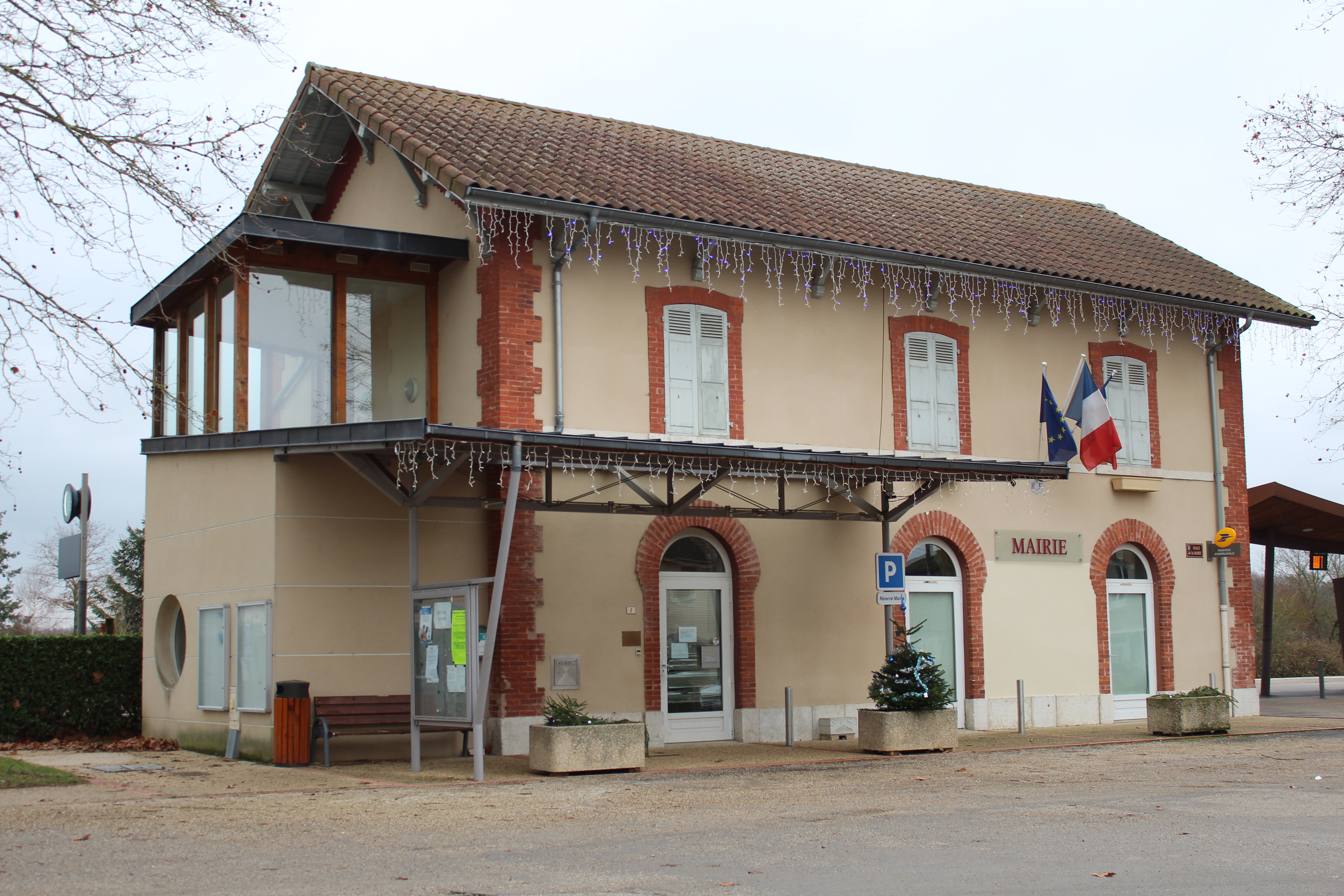
Historic passenger building, since re-converted to serve as Mairie de Marlieux.

== See also ==
- List of SNCF stations in Auvergne-Rhône-Alpes
