= Châtillon-sur-Chalaronne =

Commune in Auvergne-Rhône-Alpes, France

- Commune
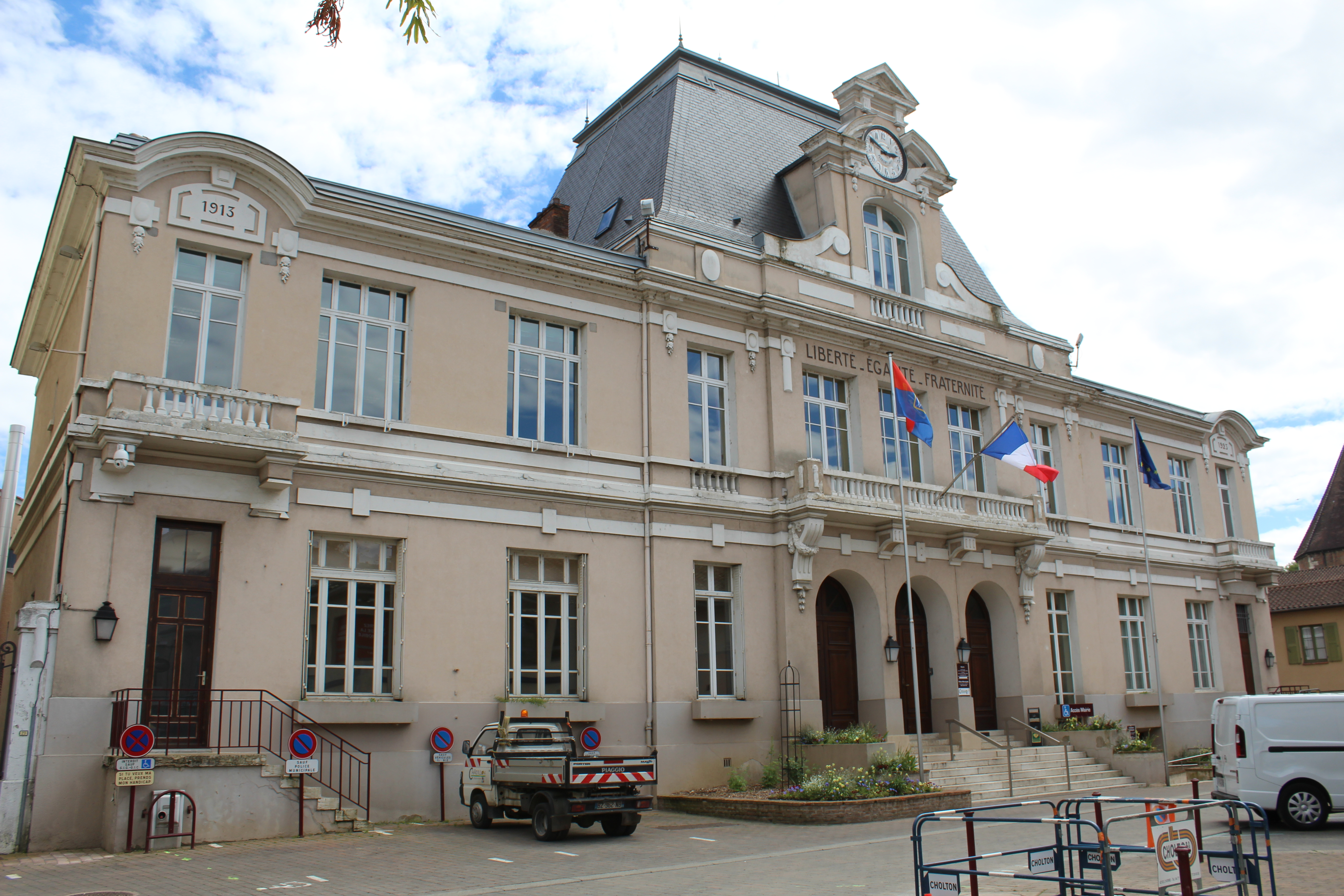
- Town hall

- Coat of arms
- Location of Châtillon-sur-Chalaronne
- Location within France Location within Auvergne-Rhône-Alpes
- Coordinates: 46°07′00″N 4°58′00″E
- Country: France
- Region: Auvergne-Rhône-Alpes
- Department: Ain
- Arrondissement: Bourg-en-Bresse
- Canton: Châtillon-sur-Chalaronne
- Intercommunality: CC Dombes

Government
  - Mayor (2026–32): Patrick Mathias
- Area^{1}: 17.86 km^{2} (6.90 sq mi)
- Elevation: 225 m (738 ft)
- Highest elevation: 274 m (899 ft)
- Lowest elevation: 215 m (705 ft)
- Population (2023): 5,250
  - Density: 294/km^{2} (761/sq mi)
- Time zone: UTC+01:00 (CET)
  - Summer (DST): UTC+02:00 (CEST)
- INSEE/Postal code: 01093 /01400
- ^{1} French Land Register data, which excludes lakes, ponds, glaciers > 1 km^{2} (0.386 sq mi or 247 acres) and river estuaries.

Châtillon-sur-Chalaronne (French pronunciation: [ʃatijɔ̃ syʁ ʃalaʁɔn], literally Châtillon on Chalaronne) is a commune in the Ain department in eastern France.

== History ==
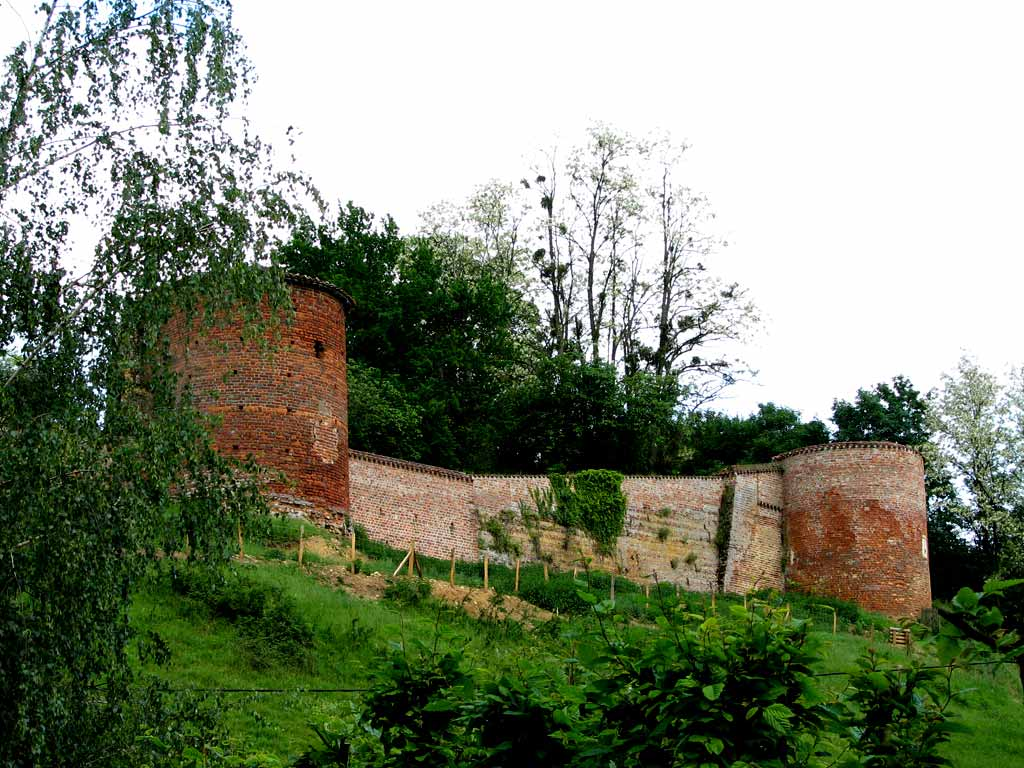
Châtillon castle fortifications

The town takes its name from a castle built around 1000 AD. It was formerly named Châtillon-les-Dombes.

== Geography ==
The Chalaronne flows northwest through the commune and crosses the town. It flows into the Saône from the left, between Saint-Didier-sur-Chalaronne and Thoissey.

== Population ==
Historical population
Year	Pop.	±% p.a.
1968	2,678	—
1975	3,241	+2.76%
1982	3,518	+1.18%
1990	3,786	+0.92%
1999	4,137	+0.99%
2007	4,904	+2.15%
2012	4,957	+0.22%
2017	4,859	−0.40%
2023	5,250	+1.30%
Source: INSEE

== Twin towns ==
- Wächtersbach (Germany)
- Colceag (Romania)

== Personalities ==
- Saint Vincent de Paul: was curate of Châtillon and founded the Brotherhood of Charity (1617)
- Philibert Commerson: botanist, born in Châtillon in 1727
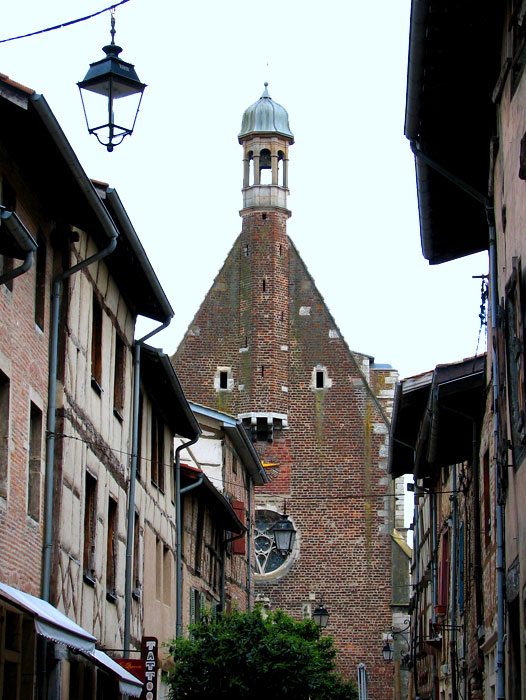
Church

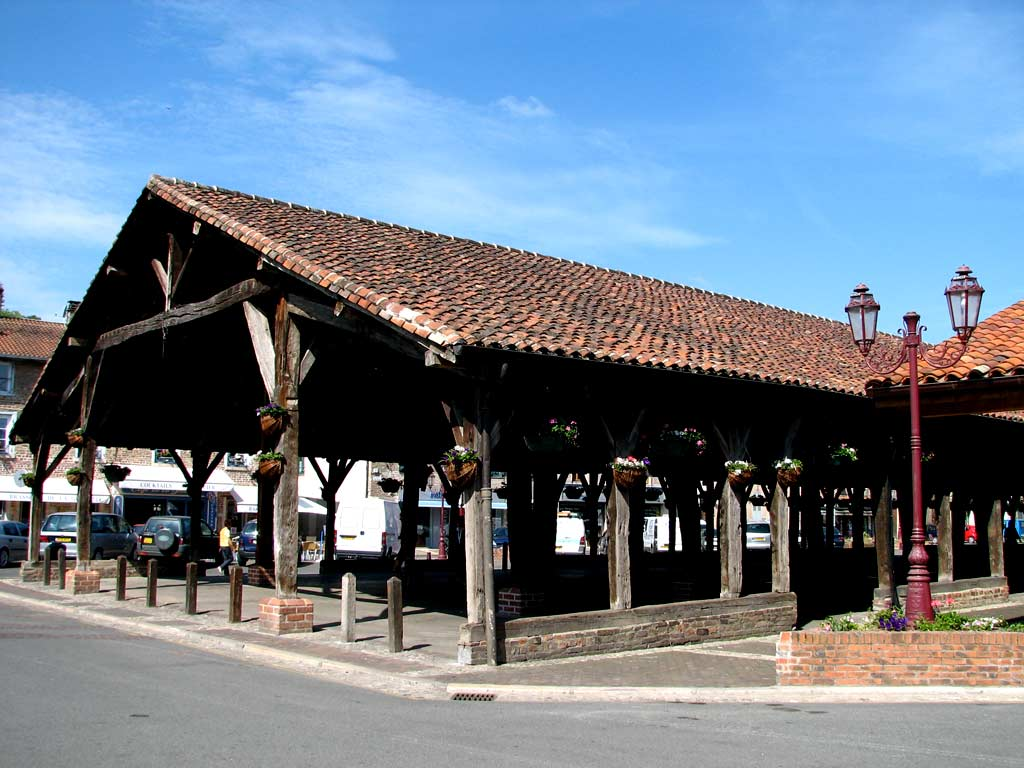
Historic market hall

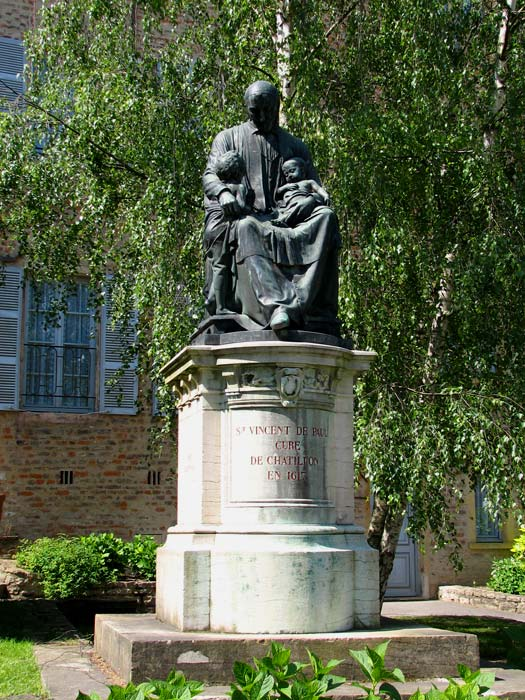
Monument Vincent de Paul

== See also ==
- Dombes
- Communes of the Ain department
