= Saint-Étienne-sur-Chalaronne =

Commune in Auvergne-Rhône-Alpes, France

- Commune
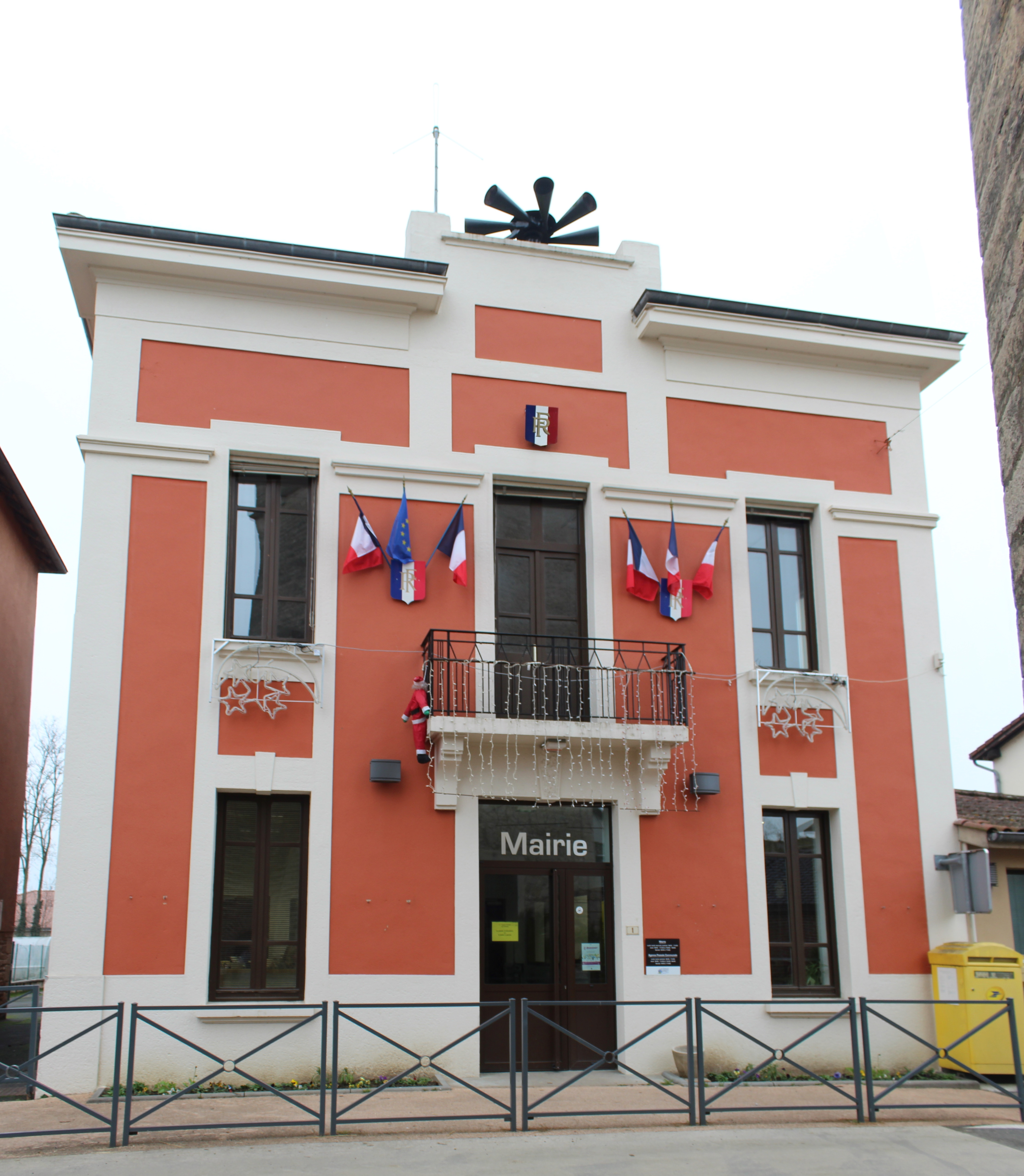
- Town hall
- Location of Saint-Étienne-sur-Chalaronne
- Location within France Location within Auvergne-Rhône-Alpes
- Coordinates: 46°09′N 4°52′E
- Country: France
- Region: Auvergne-Rhône-Alpes
- Department: Ain
- Arrondissement: Bourg-en-Bresse
- Canton: Châtillon-sur-Chalaronne

Government
  - Mayor (2026–32): Gaétan Fauvain
- Area^{1}: 20.99 km^{2} (8.10 sq mi)
- Elevation: 217 m (712 ft)
- Highest elevation: 261 m (856 ft)
- Lowest elevation: 183 m (600 ft)
- Population (2023): 1,637
  - Density: 77.99/km^{2} (202.0/sq mi)
- Time zone: UTC+01:00 (CET)
  - Summer (DST): UTC+02:00 (CEST)
- INSEE/Postal code: 01351 /01140
- ^{1} French Land Register data, which excludes lakes, ponds, glaciers > 1 km^{2} (0.386 sq mi or 247 acres) and river estuaries.

Saint-Étienne-sur-Chalaronne (French pronunciation: [sɛ̃.t‿etjɛn syʁ ʃalaʁɔn], literally Saint-Étienne on Chalaronne) is a commune in the Ain department in eastern France.

== Geography ==
The Chalaronne flows northwest through the middle of the commune and crosses the village.

== Population ==
Historical population
| Year | Pop. | ±% p.a. |
|---|---|---|
| 1968 | 878 | — |
| 1975 | 828 | −0.83% |
| 1982 | 808 | −0.35% |
| 1990 | 1,037 | +3.17% |
| 1999 | 1,179 | +1.44% |
| 2007 | 1,402 | +2.19% |
| 2012 | 1,490 | +1.22% |
| 2017 | 1,555 | +0.86% |
| 2023 | 1,637 | +0.86% |
Source: INSEE

== See also ==
- Communes of the Ain department
