= Marlieux =

Commune in Auvergne-Rhône-Alpes, France

Marlieux Marelyô (Arpitan)
- Commune
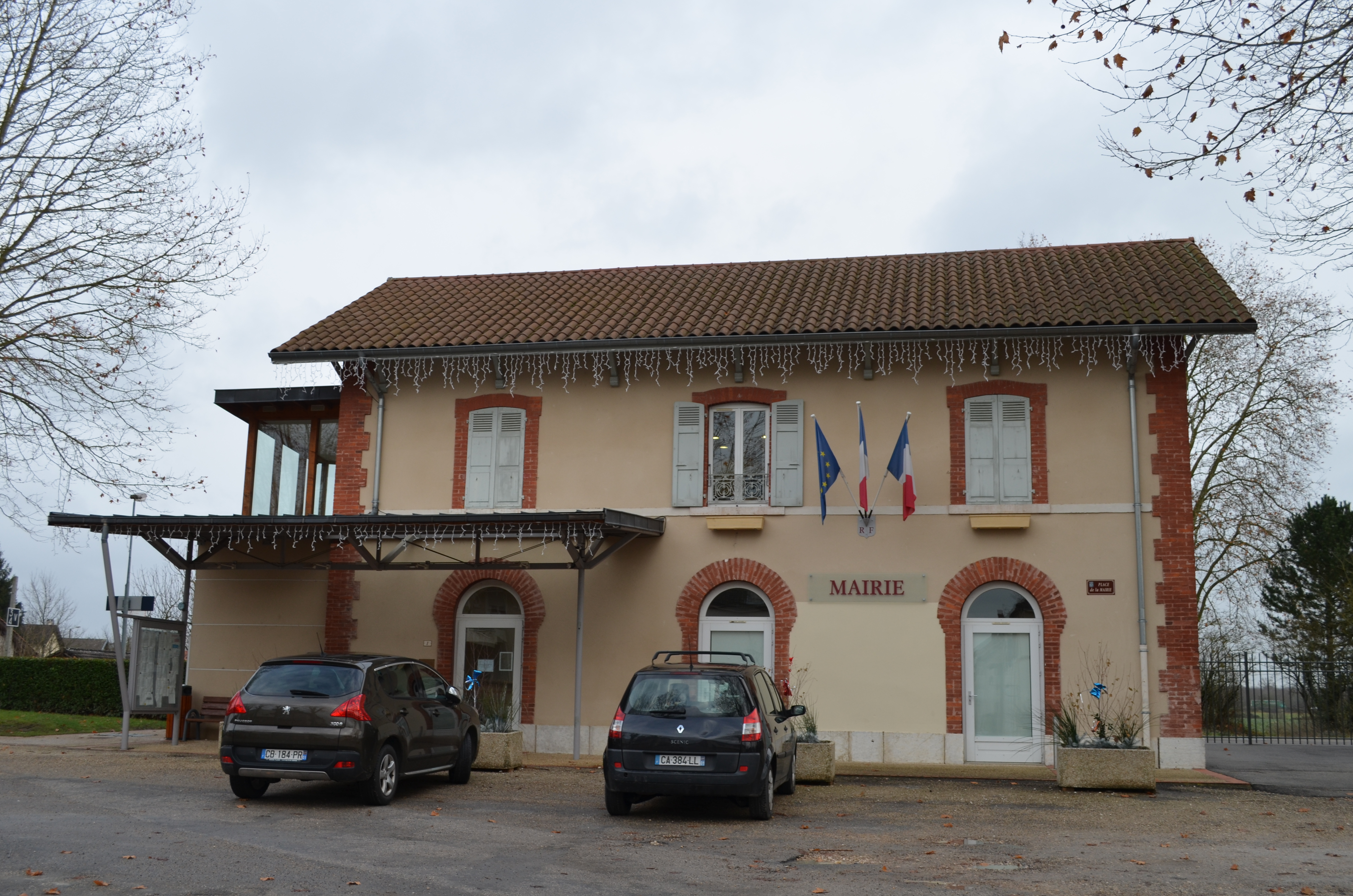
- Town hall

- Coat of arms
- Location of Marlieux
- Location within France Location within Auvergne-Rhône-Alpes
- Coordinates: 46°03′54″N 5°04′12″E
- Country: France
- Region: Auvergne-Rhône-Alpes
- Department: Ain
- Arrondissement: Bourg-en-Bresse
- Canton: Châtillon-sur-Chalaronne
- Intercommunality: CC de la Dombes

Government
  - Mayor (2026–32): Chantal Dessertine
- Area^{1}: 16.85 km^{2} (6.51 sq mi)
- Elevation: 230 m (750 ft)
- Highest elevation: 282 m (925 ft)
- Lowest elevation: 263 m (863 ft)
- Population (2023): 1,185
  - Density: 70.33/km^{2} (182.1/sq mi)
- Time zone: UTC+01:00 (CET)
  - Summer (DST): UTC+02:00 (CEST)
- INSEE/Postal code: 01235 /01240
- ^{1} French Land Register data, which excludes lakes, ponds, glaciers > 1 km^{2} (0.386 sq mi or 247 acres) and river estuaries.

Marlieux (French pronunciation: [maʁljø]; Arpitan: Marelyô [mar.ˈʎy]) is a commune in the Ain department in eastern France. Marlieux—Châtillon station has rail connections to Bourg-en-Bresse and Lyon.

== Geography ==
The river Chalaronne forms part of the commune's western border.

=== Climate ===
Marlieux has an oceanic climate (Köppen climate classification Cfb). The average annual temperature in Marlieux is 12.2 °C (54.0 °F). The average annual rainfall is 909.1 mm (35.79 in) with October as the wettest month. The temperatures are highest on average in July, at around 21.3 °C (70.3 °F), and lowest in January, at around 3.4 °C (38.1 °F). The highest temperature ever recorded in Marlieux was 41.3 °C (106.3 °F) on 13 August 2003; the coldest temperature ever recorded was −23.0 °C (−9.4 °F) on 6 January 1971.

Climate data for Marlieux (1991–2020 averages, extremes 1964−present)
Month	Jan	Feb	Mar	Apr	May	Jun	Jul	Aug	Sep	Oct	Nov	Dec	Year
Record high °C (°F)	18.9 (66.0)	20.6 (69.1)	25.2 (77.4)	30.0 (86.0)	34.3 (93.7)	38.7 (101.7)	39.2 (102.6)	41.3 (106.3)	34.5 (94.1)	28.5 (83.3)	22.4 (72.3)	19.0 (66.2)	41.3 (106.3)
Mean daily maximum °C (°F)	6.2 (43.2)	8.1 (46.6)	13.1 (55.6)	16.8 (62.2)	21.1 (70.0)	25.3 (77.5)	27.8 (82.0)	27.7 (81.9)	22.8 (73.0)	17.2 (63.0)	10.6 (51.1)	6.8 (44.2)	17.0 (62.6)
Daily mean °C (°F)	3.4 (38.1)	4.4 (39.9)	8.2 (46.8)	11.4 (52.5)	15.5 (59.9)	19.3 (66.7)	21.3 (70.3)	21.1 (70.0)	17.0 (62.6)	12.8 (55.0)	7.3 (45.1)	4.1 (39.4)	12.2 (54.0)
Mean daily minimum °C (°F)	0.5 (32.9)	0.6 (33.1)	3.2 (37.8)	5.9 (42.6)	9.9 (49.8)	13.2 (55.8)	14.8 (58.6)	14.4 (57.9)	11.1 (52.0)	8.4 (47.1)	4.0 (39.2)	1.4 (34.5)	7.3 (45.1)
Record low °C (°F)	−23.0 (−9.4)	−16.5 (2.3)	−12.5 (9.5)	−6.2 (20.8)	−2.5 (27.5)	2.5 (36.5)	3.8 (38.8)	3.6 (38.5)	−0.8 (30.6)	−7.1 (19.2)	−9.9 (14.2)	−16.3 (2.7)	−23.0 (−9.4)
Average precipitation mm (inches)	61.5 (2.42)	52.8 (2.08)	56.0 (2.20)	75.2 (2.96)	82.8 (3.26)	76.7 (3.02)	80.8 (3.18)	71.1 (2.80)	85.9 (3.38)	102.8 (4.05)	96.4 (3.80)	67.1 (2.64)	909.1 (35.79)
Average precipitation days (≥ 1.0 mm)	10.0	9.4	9.0	9.2	10.7	8.7	8.3	7.8	8.0	10.8	10.9	11.3	114.1
Source: Meteociel

== Population ==
Historical population
Year	Pop.	±% p.a.
1968	641	—
1975	632	−0.20%
1982	679	+1.03%
1990	633	−0.87%
1999	677	+0.75%
2007	758	+1.42%
2012	960	+4.84%
2017	1,112	+2.98%
2023	1,185	+1.07%
Source: INSEE

== See also ==
- Communes of the Ain department
