= La Chapelle-du-Châtelard =

Commune in Auvergne-Rhône-Alpes, France

- Commune
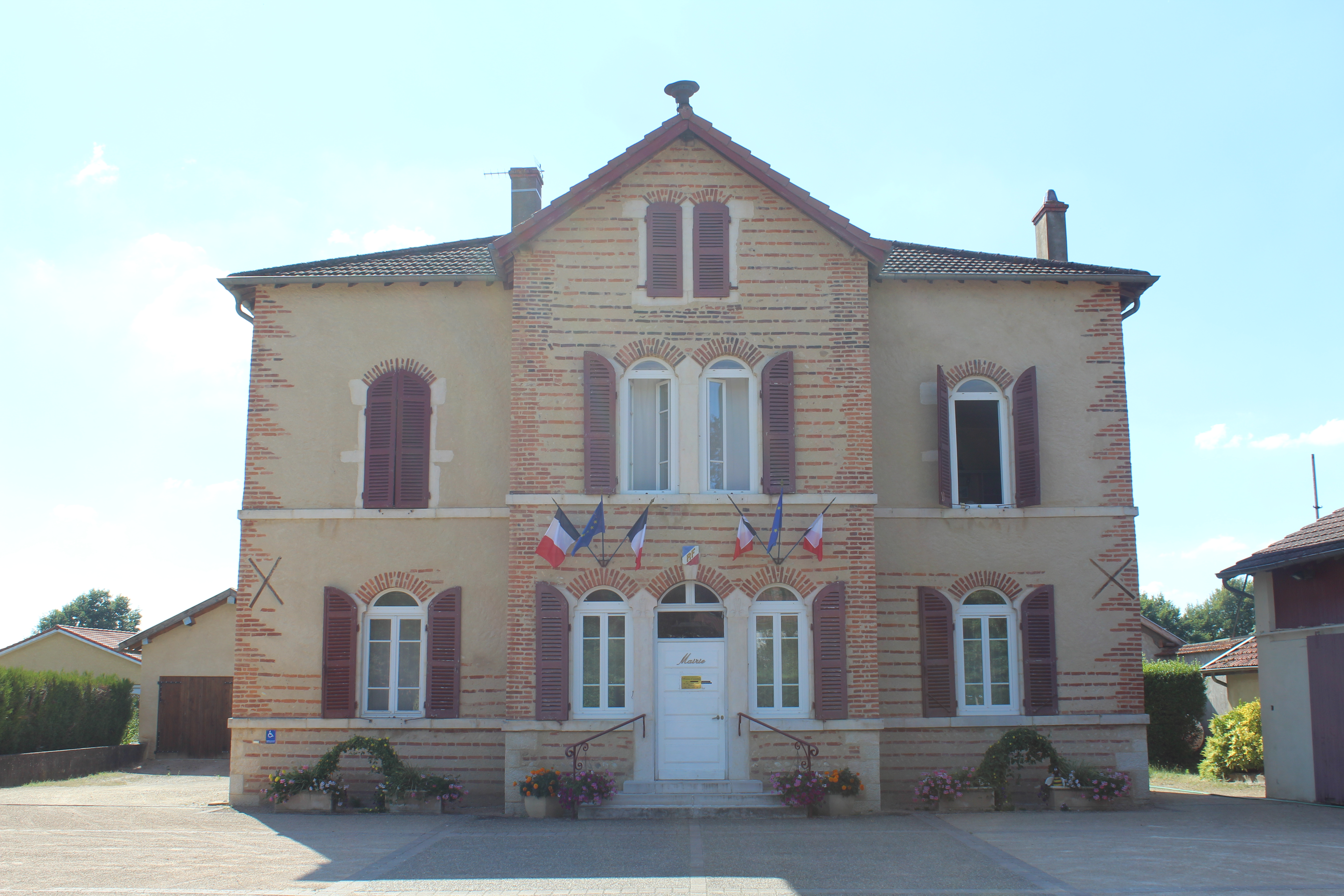
- Town hall
- Location of La Chapelle-du-Châtelard
- Location within France Location within Auvergne-Rhône-Alpes
- Coordinates: 46°04′11″N 5°01′34″E
- Country: France
- Region: Auvergne-Rhône-Alpes
- Department: Ain
- Arrondissement: Bourg-en-Bresse
- Canton: Châtillon-sur-Chalaronne
- Intercommunality: Dombes

Government
  - Mayor (2026–32): Cyrille Rimaud
- Area^{1}: 13.37 km^{2} (5.16 sq mi)
- Elevation: 266 m (873 ft)
- Highest elevation: 285 m (935 ft)
- Lowest elevation: 236 m (774 ft)
- Population (2023): 388
  - Density: 29.0/km^{2} (75.2/sq mi)
- Time zone: UTC+01:00 (CET)
  - Summer (DST): UTC+02:00 (CEST)
- INSEE/Postal code: 01085 /01240
- ^{1} French Land Register data, which excludes lakes, ponds, glaciers > 1 km^{2} (0.386 sq mi or 247 acres) and river estuaries.

La Chapelle-du-Châtelard (French pronunciation: [la ʃapɛl dy ʃatlaʁ]) is a commune in the Ain department in eastern France.

== Geography ==
The Chalaronne forms the commune's southeastern border, flows northwest through the northern part of the commune, then forms part of its northwestern border.

== Population ==
Historical population
Year	Pop.	±% p.a.
1968	210	—
1975	202	−0.55%
1982	242	+2.61%
1990	247	+0.26%
1999	263	+0.70%
2007	310	+2.08%
2012	363	+3.21%
2017	388	+1.34%
2023	388	+0.00%
Source: INSEE

== See also ==
- Communes of the Ain department
