= Bouligneux =

Commune in Auvergne-Rhône-Alpes, France

- Commune
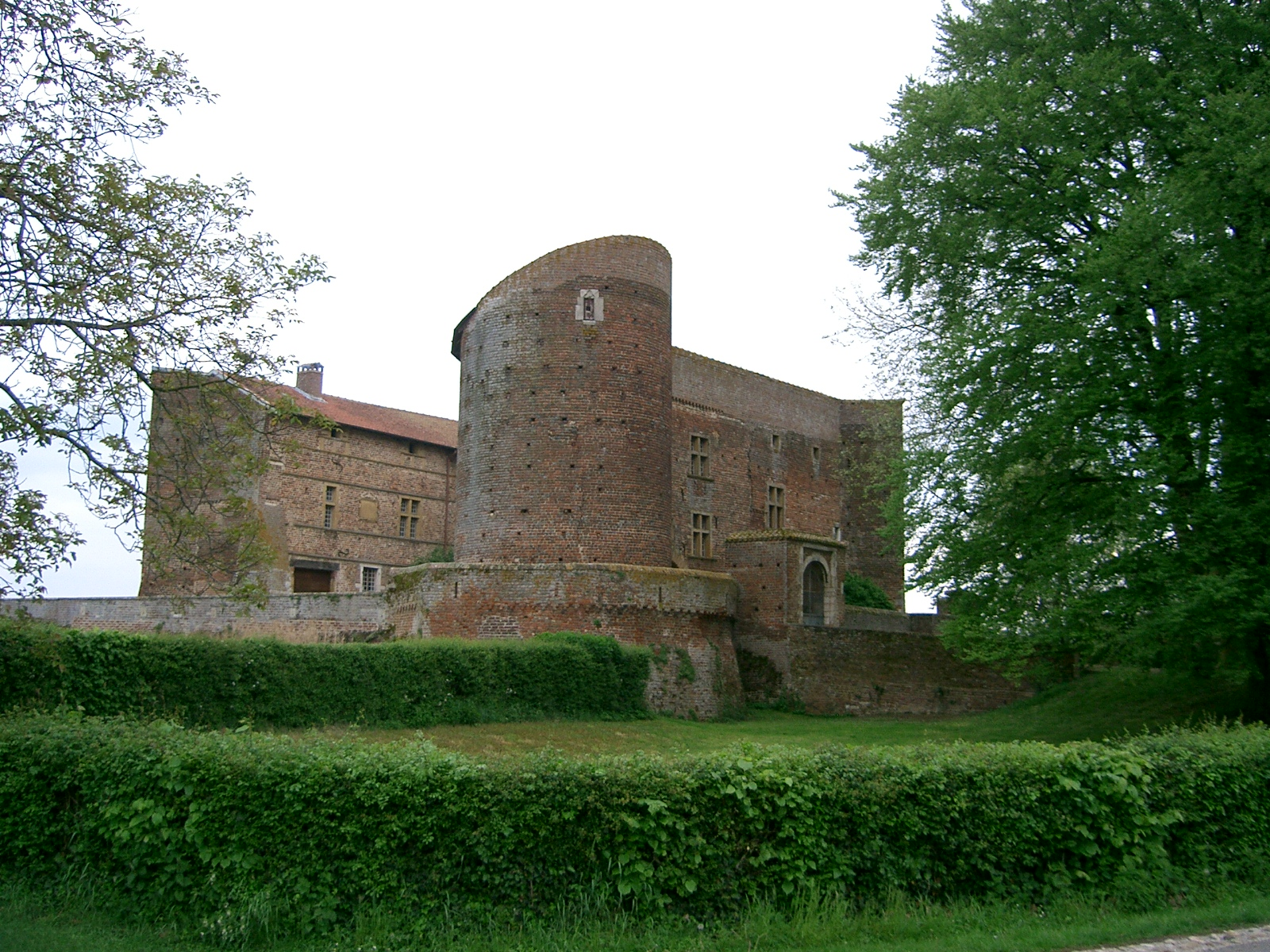
- Chateau

- Coat of arms
- Location of Bouligneux
- Location within France Location within Auvergne-Rhône-Alpes
- Coordinates: 46°01′23″N 4°59′28″E
- Country: France
- Region: Auvergne-Rhône-Alpes
- Department: Ain
- Arrondissement: Bourg-en-Bresse
- Canton: Villars-les-Dombes
- Intercommunality: Dombes

Government
  - Mayor (2026–32): Laurent Comtet
- Area^{1}: 26.09 km^{2} (10.07 sq mi)
- Elevation: 280 m (920 ft)
- Highest elevation: 301 m (988 ft)
- Lowest elevation: 264 m (866 ft)
- Population (2023): 318
  - Density: 12.2/km^{2} (31.6/sq mi)
- Time zone: UTC+01:00 (CET)
  - Summer (DST): UTC+02:00 (CEST)
- INSEE/Postal code: 01052 /01330
- ^{1} French Land Register data, which excludes lakes, ponds, glaciers > 1 km^{2} (0.386 sq mi or 247 acres) and river estuaries.

Bouligneux (French pronunciation: [buliɲø]; Arpitan: Bolegniô) is a commune in the Ain department in eastern France, in Dombes, within the Auvergne-Rhône-Alpes region.

== Geography ==
The Chalaronne forms most of the commune's eastern border.

== History ==
Bouligneux first appears as vicus Beliniacum in 885, in a document of Charles III.

On 28 March 944 Hugues, son or Bermund, Lord of Bouligneux and Gisèle, signed a document renouncing any claims on Thoissey, in favor of Adémar, Viscount of Lyon.

In 1280, it belonged to Vaucher de Commarin, who sold it to Henri de Villars in 1290.

In 1402, Bouligneux was part of Bresse Savoyarde.

In the 17th century, Bouligneux was a county.

== Population ==
Historical population
Year	Pop.	±% p.a.
1968	208	—
1975	172	−2.68%
1982	247	+5.31%
1990	274	+1.31%
1999	290	+0.63%
2007	304	+0.59%
2012	310	+0.39%
2017	328	+1.14%
2023	318	−0.51%
Source: INSEE

== See also ==
- Communes of the Ain department
- Dombes
