= Saint-Germain-sur-Renon =

Commune in Auvergne-Rhône-Alpes, France

- Commune
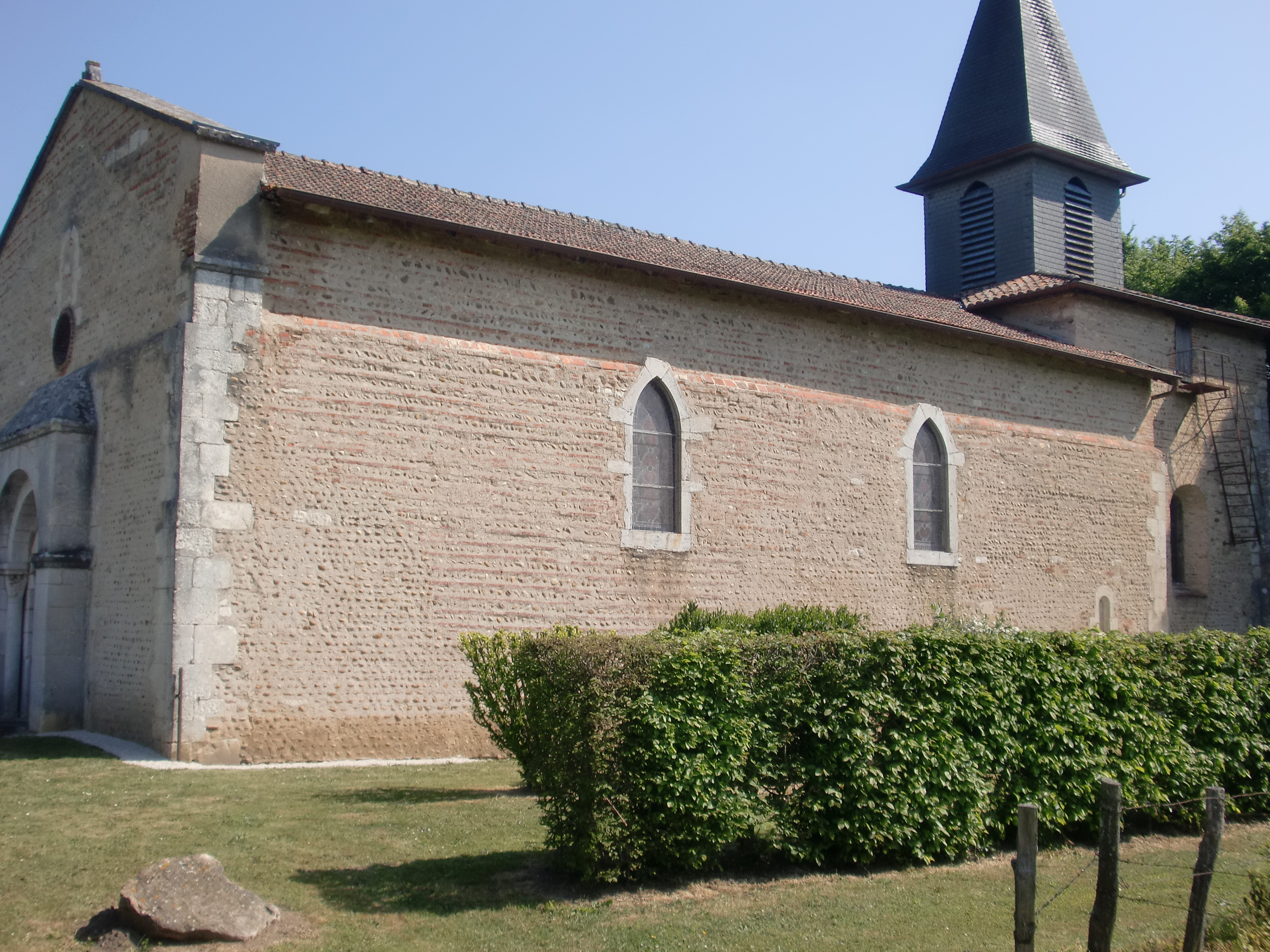

- Coat of arms
- Location of Saint-Germain-sur-Renon
- Location within France Location within Auvergne-Rhône-Alpes
- Coordinates: 46°04′54″N 5°03′29″E
- Country: France
- Region: Auvergne-Rhône-Alpes
- Department: Ain
- Arrondissement: Bourg-en-Bresse
- Canton: Châtillon-sur-Chalaronne

Government
  - Mayor (2020–2026): Christophe Monier
- Area^{1}: 15.8 km^{2} (6.1 sq mi)
- Elevation: 280 m (920 ft)
- Highest elevation: 286 m (938 ft)
- Lowest elevation: 251 m (823 ft)
- Population (2023): 264
  - Density: 16.7/km^{2} (43.3/sq mi)
- Time zone: UTC+01:00 (CET)
  - Summer (DST): UTC+02:00 (CEST)
- INSEE/Postal code: 01359 /01240
- ^{1} French Land Register data, which excludes lakes, ponds, glaciers > 1 km^{2} (0.386 sq mi or 247 acres) and river estuaries.

Saint-Germain-sur-Renon (French pronunciation: [sɛ̃ ʒɛʁmɛ̃ syʁ ʁənɔ̃]; Arpitan: Sent-Gèrman) is a commune in the Ain department in eastern France.

== Geography ==
The Chalaronne forms part of the commune's western border.

== Population ==
Historical population
Year	Pop.	±% p.a.
1968	177	—
1975	148	−2.52%
1982	152	+0.38%
1990	190	+2.83%
1999	215	+1.38%
2007	239	+1.33%
2012	233	−0.51%
2017	236	+0.26%
2023	264	+1.89%
Source: INSEE

== See also ==
- Communes of the Ain department
