= Dompierre-sur-Chalaronne =

Commune in Auvergne-Rhône-Alpes, France

- Commune
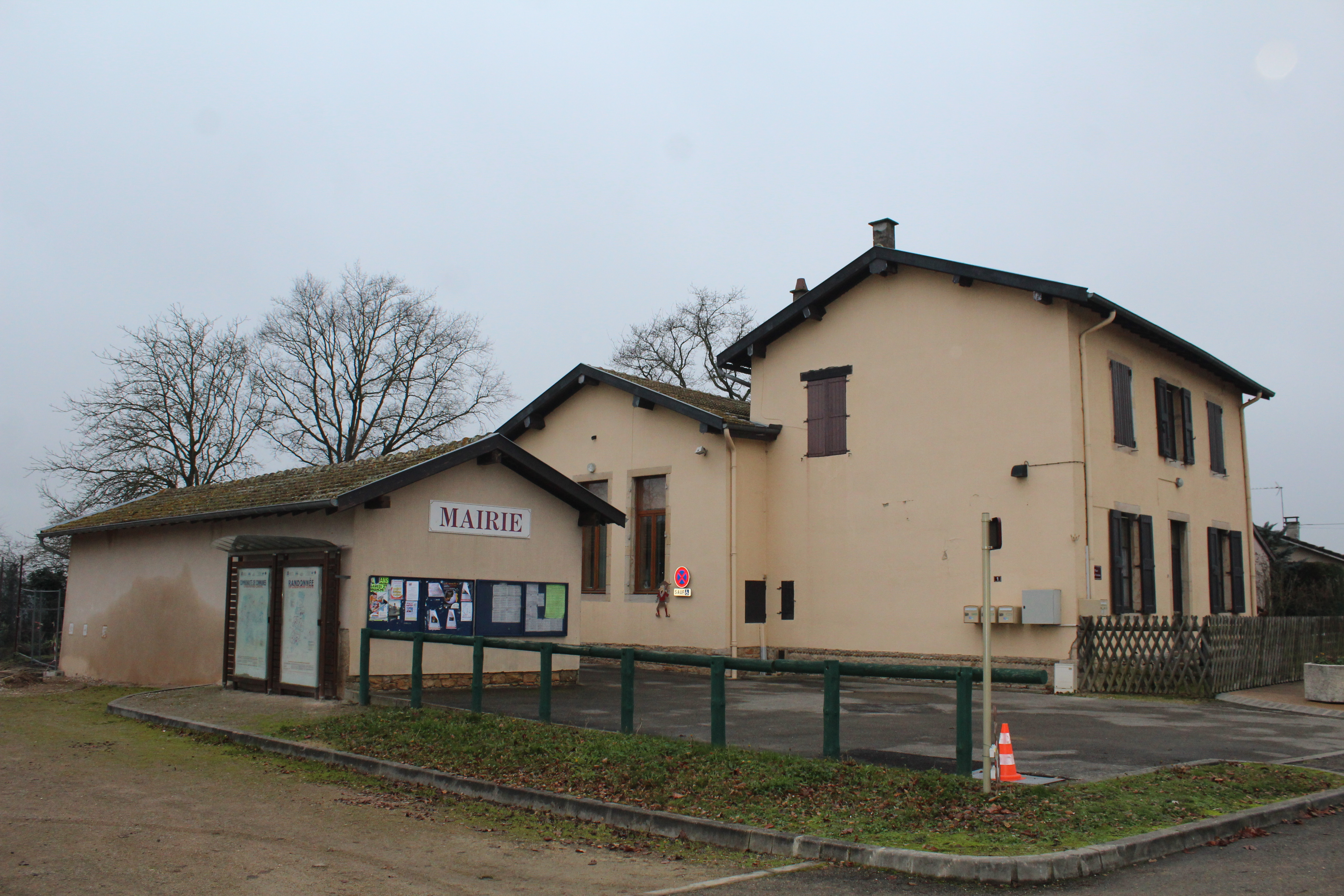
- Town hall
- Location of Dompierre-sur-Chalaronne
- Location within France Location within Auvergne-Rhône-Alpes
- Coordinates: 46°08′00″N 4°54′00″E
- Country: France
- Region: Auvergne-Rhône-Alpes
- Department: Ain
- Arrondissement: Bourg-en-Bresse
- Canton: Châtillon-sur-Chalaronne
- Intercommunality: CC de la Dombes

Government
  - Mayor (2026–32): Olivier Bonnefin
- Area^{1}: 4.78 km^{2} (1.85 sq mi)
- Elevation: 221 m (725 ft)
- Highest elevation: 262 m (860 ft)
- Lowest elevation: 200 m (660 ft)
- Population (2023): 456
  - Density: 95.4/km^{2} (247/sq mi)
- Time zone: UTC+01:00 (CET)
  - Summer (DST): UTC+02:00 (CEST)
- INSEE/Postal code: 01146 /01400
- ^{1} French Land Register data, which excludes lakes, ponds, glaciers > 1 km^{2} (0.386 sq mi or 247 acres) and river estuaries.

Dompierre-sur-Chalaronne (French pronunciation: [dɔ̃pjɛʁ syʁ ʃalaʁɔn], literally Dompierre on Chalaronne) is a commune in the Ain department in eastern France.

== Geography ==
The Chalaronne flows west-northwest through the southern part of the commune.

== Population ==
Historical population
Year	Pop.	±% p.a.
1968	156	—
1975	154	−0.18%
1982	183	+2.50%
1990	268	+4.88%
1999	279	+0.45%
2007	362	+3.31%
2012	389	+1.45%
2017	435	+2.26%
2023	456	+0.79%
Source: INSEE

== See also ==
- Communes of the Ain department
- Dombes
