= Chalaronne =

River in eastern France

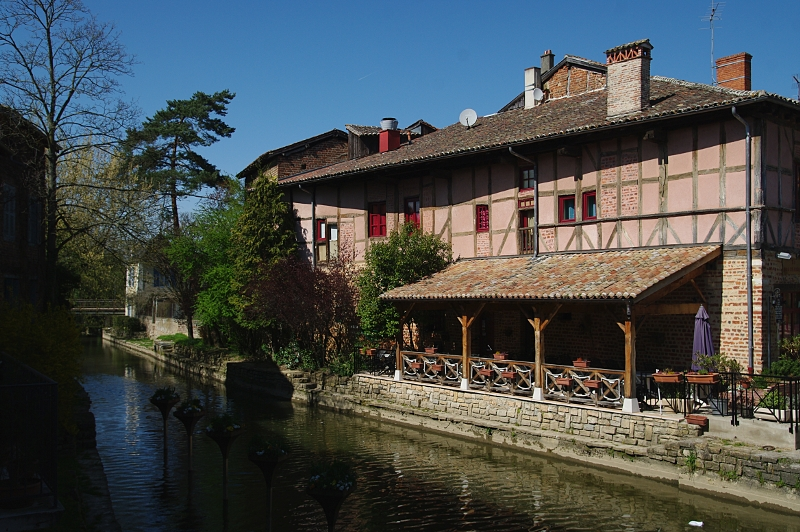
- The Chalaronne at Châtillon-sur-Chalaronne

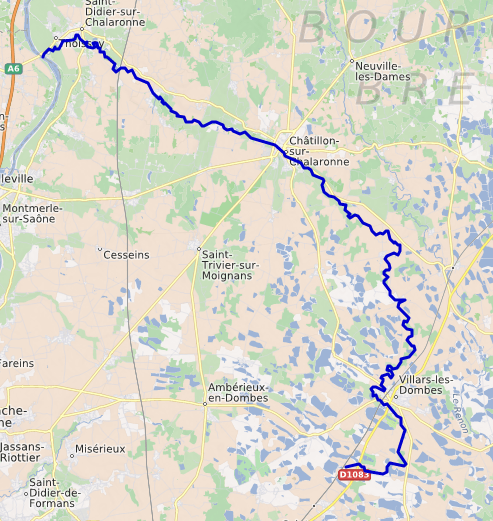

Location
- Country: France

Physical characteristics
- Source
  - location: Lapeyrouse
  - coordinates: 45°58′04″N 04°59′54″E
  - elevation: 280 m (920 ft)
- Mouth
  - location: Saône
  - coordinates: 46°09′54″N 04°47′31″E
  - elevation: 170 m (560 ft)
- Length: 52 km (32 mi)
- Basin size: 175 km^{2} (68 sq mi)
- Discharge
  - average: 1.01 m^{3}/s (36 cu ft/s)

Basin features
- Progression: Saône→ Rhône→ Mediterranean Sea

The Chalaronne (French pronunciation: [ʃalaʁɔn]) is a 52 km (32 mi) long river in the Ain department in eastern France. Its source is at Lapeyrouse, in the Dombes. It flows generally northwest. It is a left tributary of the Saône, into which it flows between Saint-Didier-sur-Chalaronne and Thoissey.

== Communes along its course ==
This list is ordered from source to mouth: Lapeyrouse, Birieux, Villars-les-Dombes, Bouligneux, La Chapelle-du-Châtelard, Marlieux, Saint-Germain-sur-Renon, Sandrans, Romans, Châtillon-sur-Chalaronne, L'Abergement-Clémenciat, Dompierre-sur-Chalaronne, Saint-Étienne-sur-Chalaronne and Saint-Didier-sur-Chalaronne. The Chalaronne discharges into the Saône shortly before Thoissey.
