= Birieux =

Commune in Auvergne-Rhône-Alpes, France

Birieux Beriœx (Arpitan)
- Commune
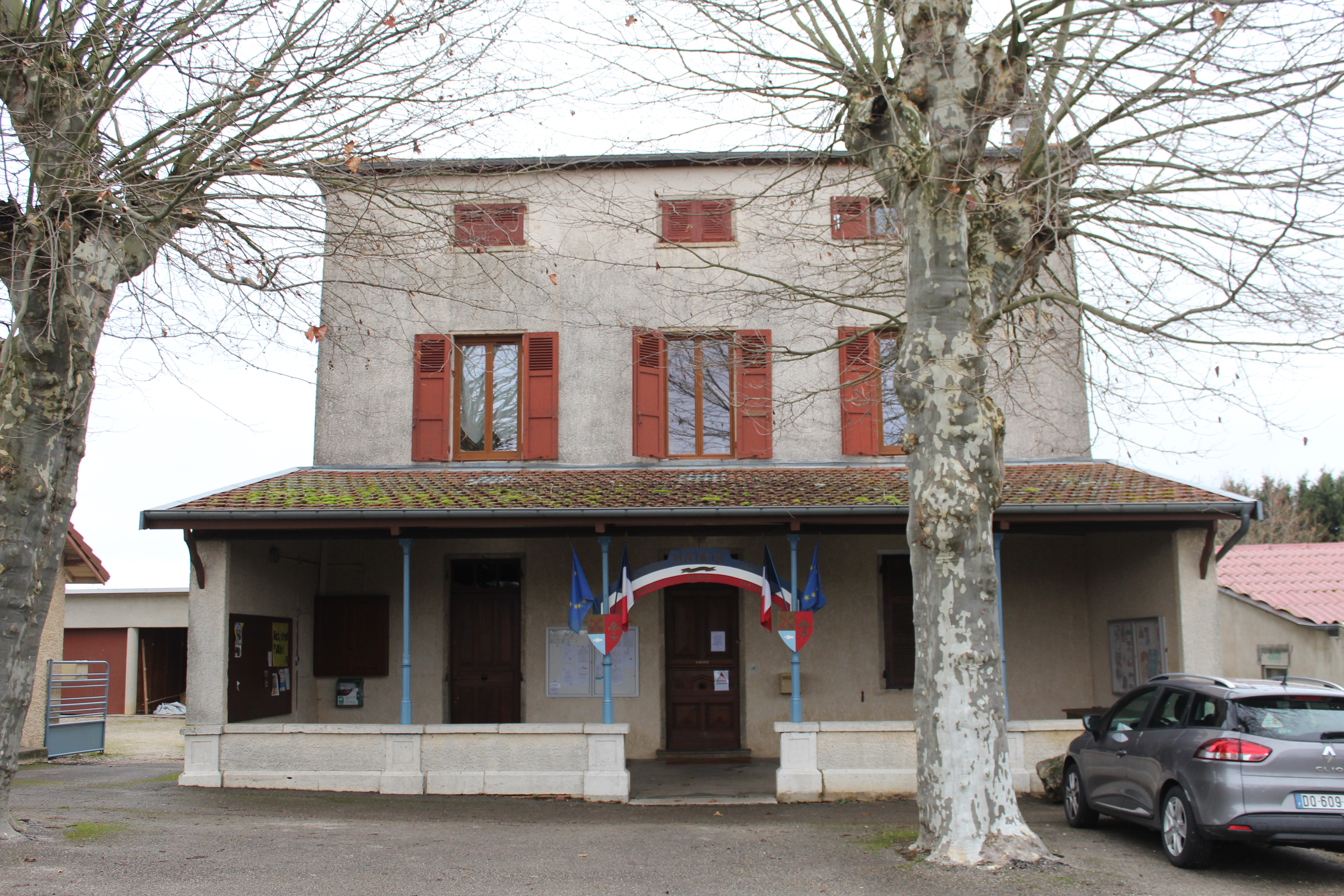
- Town hall

- Coat of arms
- Location of Birieux
- Location within France Location within Auvergne-Rhône-Alpes
- Coordinates: 45°57′12″N 5°02′23″E
- Country: France
- Region: Auvergne-Rhône-Alpes
- Department: Ain
- Arrondissement: Bourg-en-Bresse
- Canton: Villars-les-Dombes
- Intercommunality: Dombes

Government
  - Mayor (2026–32): Cyril Baillet
- Area^{1}: 15.83 km^{2} (6.11 sq mi)
- Elevation: 285 m (935 ft)
- Highest elevation: 295 m (968 ft)
- Lowest elevation: 277 m (909 ft)
- Population (2023): 275
  - Density: 17.4/km^{2} (45.0/sq mi)
- Time zone: UTC+01:00 (CET)
  - Summer (DST): UTC+02:00 (CEST)
- INSEE/Postal code: 01045 /01330
- ^{1} French Land Register data, which excludes lakes, ponds, glaciers > 1 km^{2} (0.386 sq mi or 247 acres) and river estuaries.

Birieux (French pronunciation: [biʁjø]; Arpitan: Beriœx [bə.ˈðjy]) is a commune in the Ain department in eastern France.

== Geography ==
The Chalaronne forms part of the commune's northwestern border.

== History ==
Birieux is first mentioned in the 12th century as a priory dependent on the abbey of l'Île Barbe à Lyon.

In the Middle Ages, Birieux was a possession of the lords of Thoire-Villars.

In 1789, the commune was included in the canton of Meximieux.

== Population ==
Historical population
Year	Pop.	±% p.a.
1968	110	—
1975	97	−1.78%
1982	102	+0.72%
1990	125	+2.57%
1999	145	+1.66%
2007	220	+5.35%
2012	265	+3.79%
2017	283	+1.32%
2023	275	−0.48%
Source: INSEE

== Economy ==
The region is primarily agricultural, producing grain and cattle.

== See also ==
- Communes of the Ain department
- Dombes
