= Saint-Didier-sur-Chalaronne =

Commune in Auvergne-Rhône-Alpes, France

- Commune
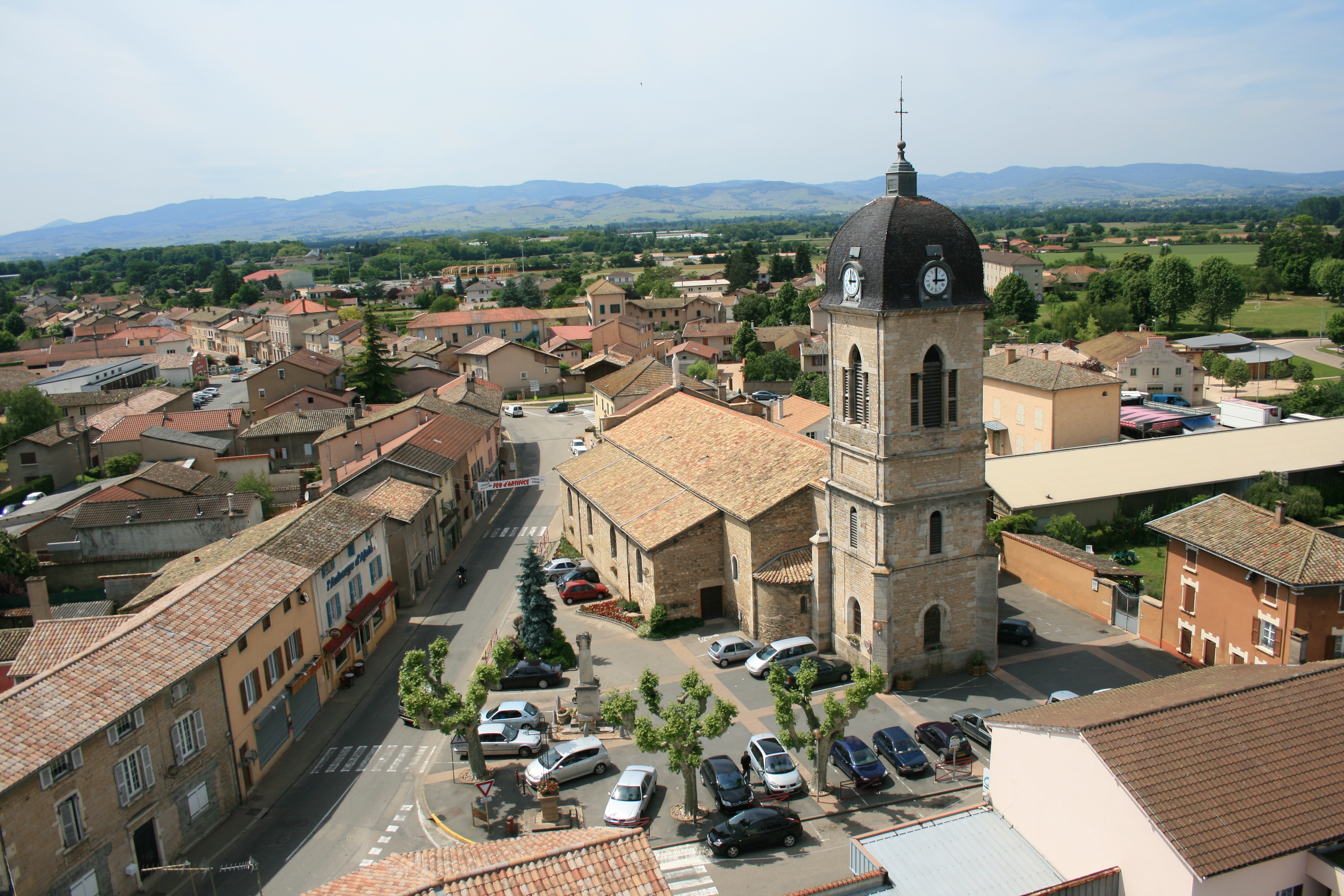

- Coat of arms
- Location of Saint-Didier-sur-Chalaronne
- Location within France Location within Auvergne-Rhône-Alpes
- Coordinates: 46°10′00″N 4°49′00″E
- Country: France
- Region: Auvergne-Rhône-Alpes
- Department: Ain
- Arrondissement: Bourg-en-Bresse
- Canton: Châtillon-sur-Chalaronne

Government
  - Mayor (2026–32): Renaud Dumay
- Area^{1}: 24.98 km^{2} (9.64 sq mi)
- Elevation: 179 m (587 ft)
- Highest elevation: 223 m (732 ft)
- Lowest elevation: 167 m (548 ft)
- Population (2023): 2,934
  - Density: 117.5/km^{2} (304.2/sq mi)
- Time zone: UTC+01:00 (CET)
  - Summer (DST): UTC+02:00 (CEST)
- INSEE/Postal code: 01348 /01140
- ^{1} French Land Register data, which excludes lakes, ponds, glaciers > 1 km^{2} (0.386 sq mi or 247 acres) and river estuaries.

Saint-Didier-sur-Chalaronne (French pronunciation: [sɛ̃ didje syʁ ʃalaʁɔn], literally Saint-Didier on Chalaronne) is a commune in the Ain department in eastern France.

== Geography ==
The Chalaronne flows westward through the southern part of the commune, then flows into the Saône, which forms part of the commune's southwestern border.

== Population ==
Historical population

Year	Pop.	±% p.a.
1793	1,337	—
1800	1,464	+1.30%
1806	2,314	+7.93%
1821	2,495	+0.50%
1831	2,859	+1.37%
1836	2,760	−0.70%
1841	2,692	−0.50%
1846	2,897	+1.48%
1851	2,710	−1.33%
1856	2,735	+0.18%
1861	2,673	−0.46%
1866	2,549	−0.95%
1872	2,681	+0.85%
1876	2,640	−0.38%
1881	2,486	−1.19%
1886	2,377	−0.89%
1891	2,288	−0.76%
1896	2,267	−0.18%
1901	2,178	−0.80%

Year	Pop.	±% p.a.
1906	2,109	−0.64%
1911	2,126	+0.16%
1921	1,964	−0.79%
1926	2,005	+0.41%
1931	2,016	+0.11%
1936	1,927	−0.90%
1946	1,875	−0.27%
1954	1,758	−0.80%
1962	1,630	−0.94%
1968	1,665	+0.35%
1975	1,752	+0.73%
1982	1,968	+1.67%
1990	2,065	+0.60%
1999	2,259	+1.00%
2007	2,616	+1.85%
2012	2,776	+1.19%
2017	2,875	+0.70%
2023	2,934	+0.34%

Source: EHESS and INSEE (1968-2023)

== See also ==
- Communes of the Ain department
