= Jacques Berthou =

French politician

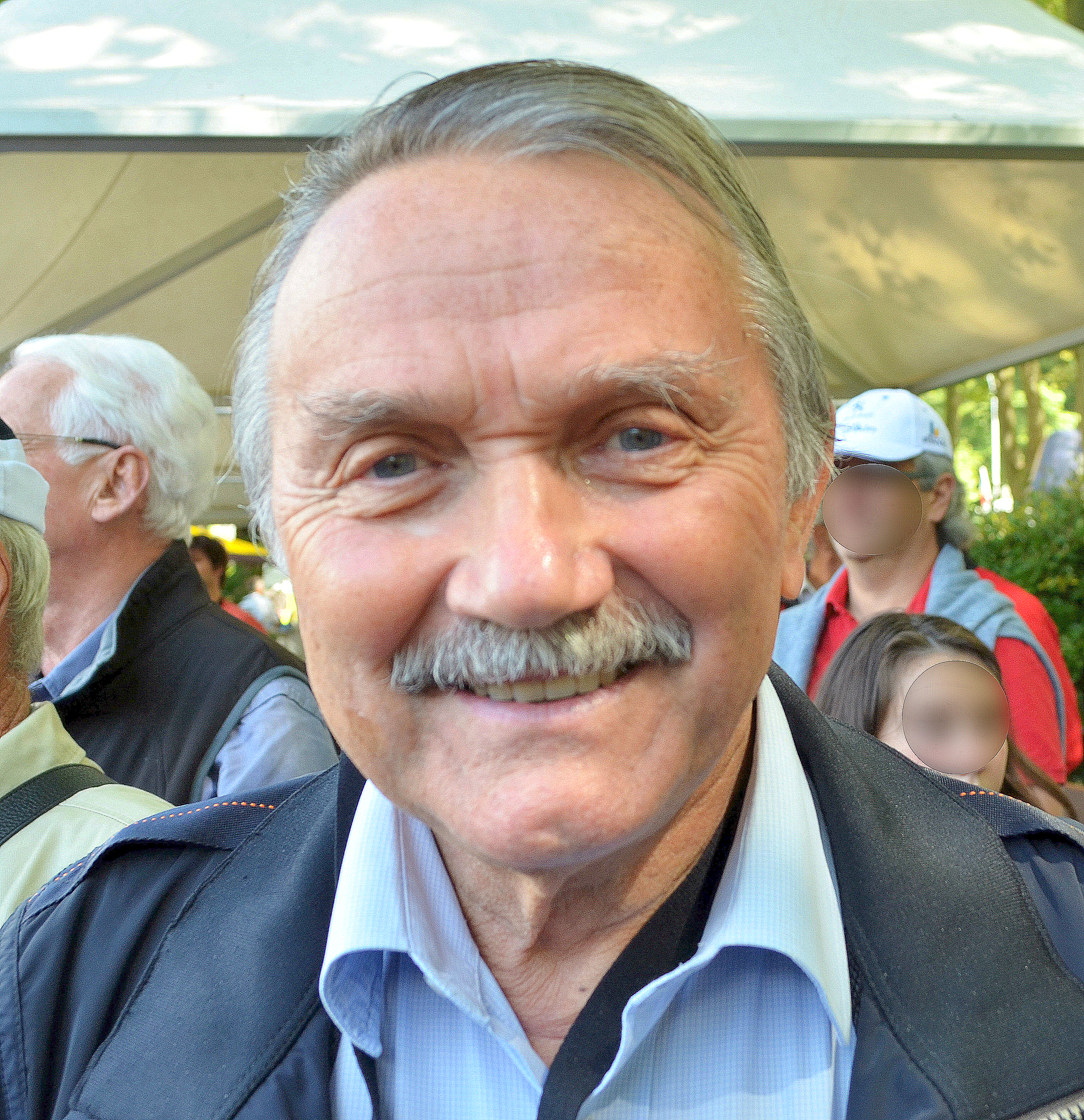
- Jacques Berthou in 2014

Member of the French Senate for Ain
- In office 1 October 2008 – 30 September 2014
- Succeeded by: Patrick Chaize

Personal details
- Born: 3 March 1940 (age 85); Lyon, France
- Political party: Socialist Party
- Profession: Engineer

Jacques Berthou (born 3 March 1940) was a member of the Senate of France, representing the Ain department as a member of the Socialist Party. He has held other elected posts. In 1995 he was elected as mayor of Miribel, being reelected in 2001 and 2008 and he has also been a member of the general council of Ain, representing the canton of Miribel, where he was elected at the first round of the voting, in 2004.
