= Les Échets station =

French railway station

Coordinates: 45°52′29″N 4°54′39″E

Les Échets
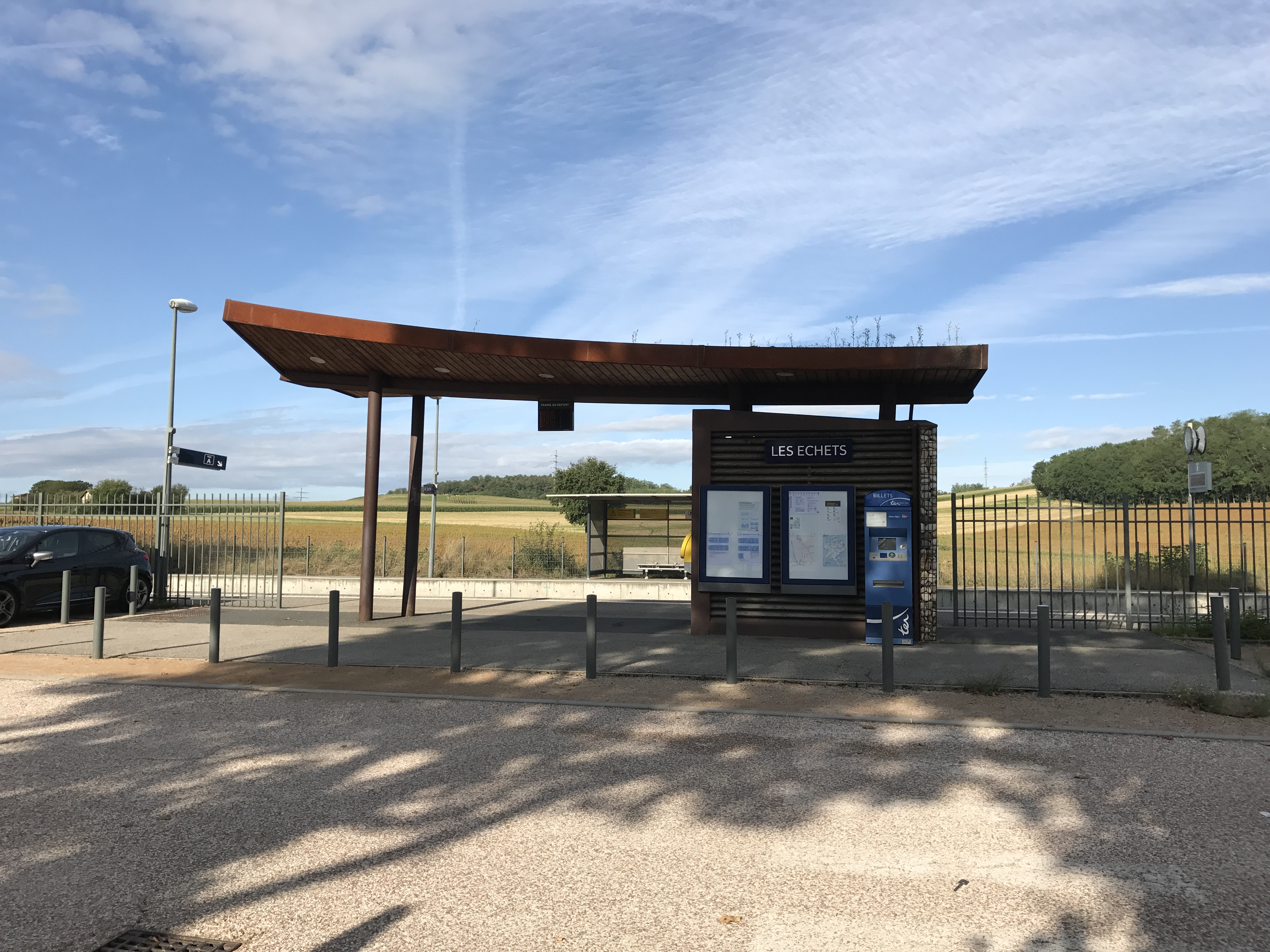
- Entrance and shelter in August 2017.

General information
- Location: Route de Strasbourg; 01700 Miribel; Ain; France
- Elevation: 278 m (912 ft)
- Owner: SNCF
- Operator: SNCF
- Line: Lyon–Bourg-en-Bresse railway
- Distance: 20.727 km
- Platforms: 2
- Tracks: 2

Other information
- Website: TER website

History
- Opened: 1 September 1866

Passengers
- 2019: 160,821

Services
Preceding station	TER Auvergne-Rhône-Alpes	Following station
Mionnay towards Bourg-en-Bresse	32	Sathonay-Rillieux towards Lyon-Vaise
Location

Les Échets station (French: Gare des Échets) is a French railway station located in the Les Échets neighbourhood of the commune of Miribel, Ain department in the Auvergne-Rhône-Alpes region. It is located at kilometric point (KP) 20.727 on the Lyon–Bourg-en-Bresse railway, between Sathonay-Rillieux and Mionnay stations. Miribel station, also located in the commune along the Rhône is located on the Lyon—Geneva railway.

The station was put into service in 1866 by the Compagnie de la Dombes.

As of 2020, the station is owned and operated by the SNCF and served by TER Auvergne-Rhône-Alpes trains.

== History ==
The "station des Échets" was put into service by the Compagnie de la Dombes, on 1 September 1866, along with the opening of railway between Sathonay and Bourg-en-Bresse.

For summer service, beginning 10 May 1869, the station was served by four daily (in each direction) "omnibus mixtes" (passengers and freight) services between Bourg-en-Bresse/Besançon/Mulhouse/Strasbourg and Lyon-Croix-Rousse. On the Bourg-en-Bresse and Lyon-Croix-Rousse service, an addition train was added on Mondays and Wednesdays.

In 1872, the station became part of the Compagnie des Dombes et des chemins de fer du Sud-Est's (DSE) network which substituted its original operator.

Les Échets station around 1900

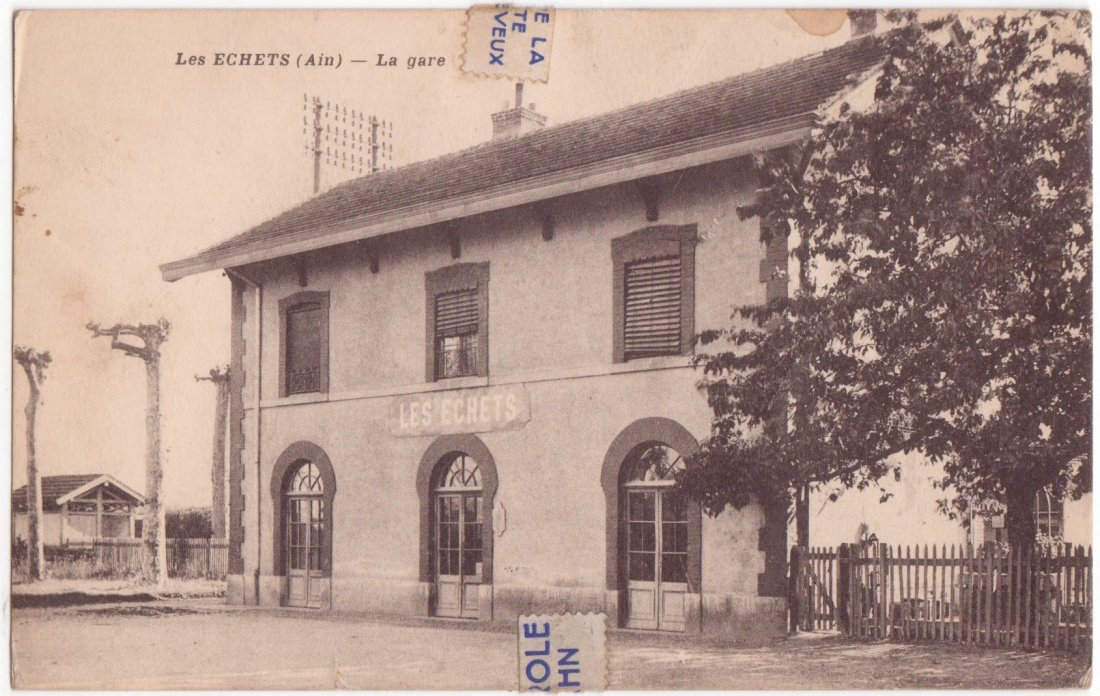
Passenger building.

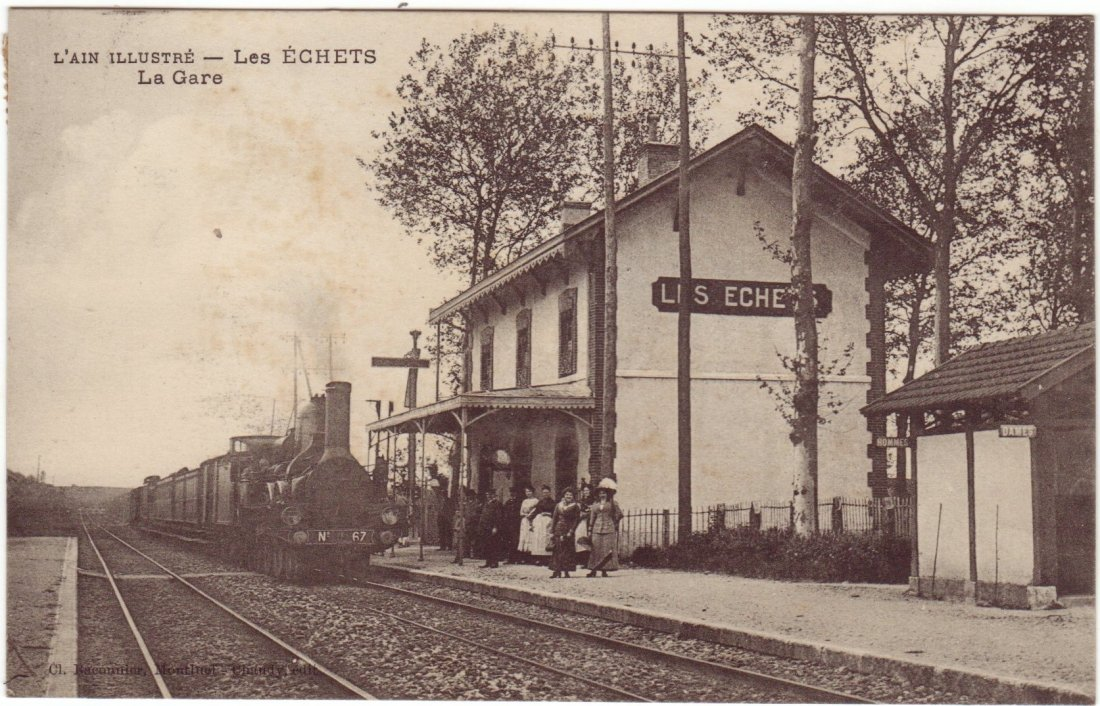
Train platforms.

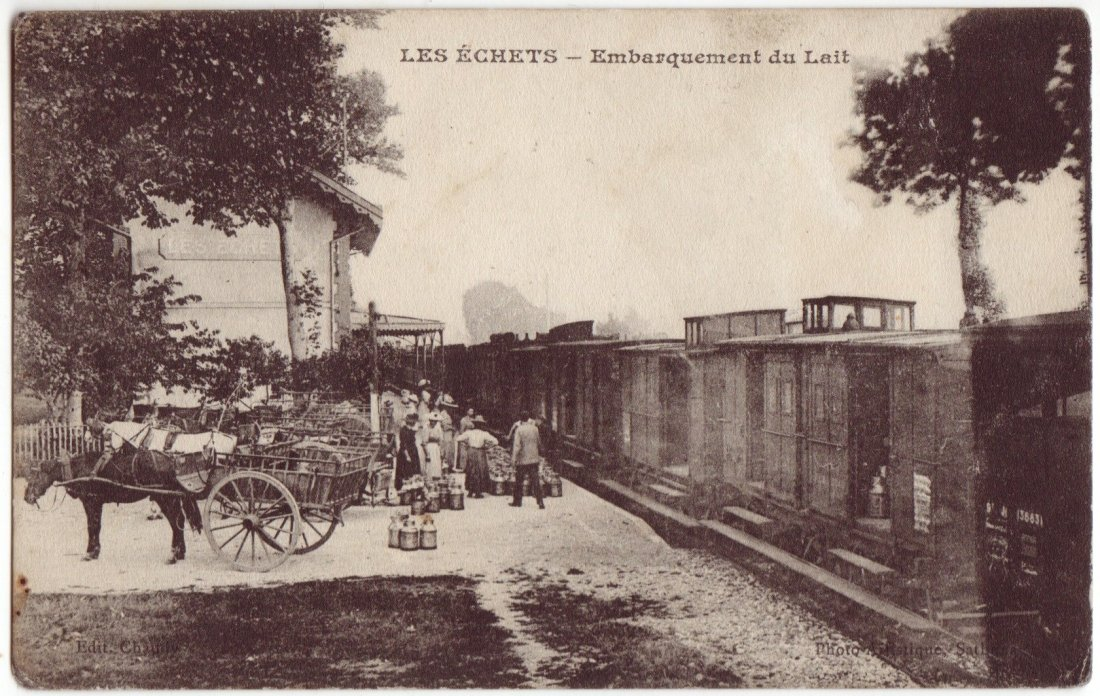
Delivery of milk.

On 10 September 1921, the station was the location of the Les Échets train accident. An express train between Strasbourg and Lyon derailed while entering the station resulting in the derailing of multiple carriages and a collision with the halle à marchandises. The accident resulted in 39 deaths and more than 60 injuries.

A decree passed on 14 April 1922, awarded the médaille d'honneur des chemins de fer to Jean-Claude-Clément Coulon, the station boss. The decoration was awarded with in relation to train accident of 10 September 1921.

The original passenger building, identical to those constructed at Villars-les-Dombes and Saint-André-de-Corcy stations by the Compagne de la Dombes has since been demolished, resulting in the station becoming a simple halt.

In February 2012, the Côtière liberté réseau intercommunal (Colibri) bus network of the Communauté de communes de Miribel et du Plateau began serving a stop near the station.

In 2019, the SNCF estimated that 160,821 passengers traveled through the station.

== Services ==
=== Passenger services ===
Classified as a PANG (point d'accès non géré), the station is unstaffed and equipped with automatic ticket dispensers.

=== Train services ===
As of 2020, the station is served by the following services:

- Regional services (TER Auvergne-Rhône-Alpes 32) Bourg-en-Bresse ... Lyon.

=== Intermodality ===
In addition to a parking lot for passengers, the station is equipped with secure bicycle storage facilities.

Bus lines 1 and 3 of the Côtière liberté réseau intercommunal (Colibri), serve the nearby gare des Échets stop.
