= Saint-Maurice-de-Beynost =

Commune in Auvergne-Rhône-Alpes, France

- Commune
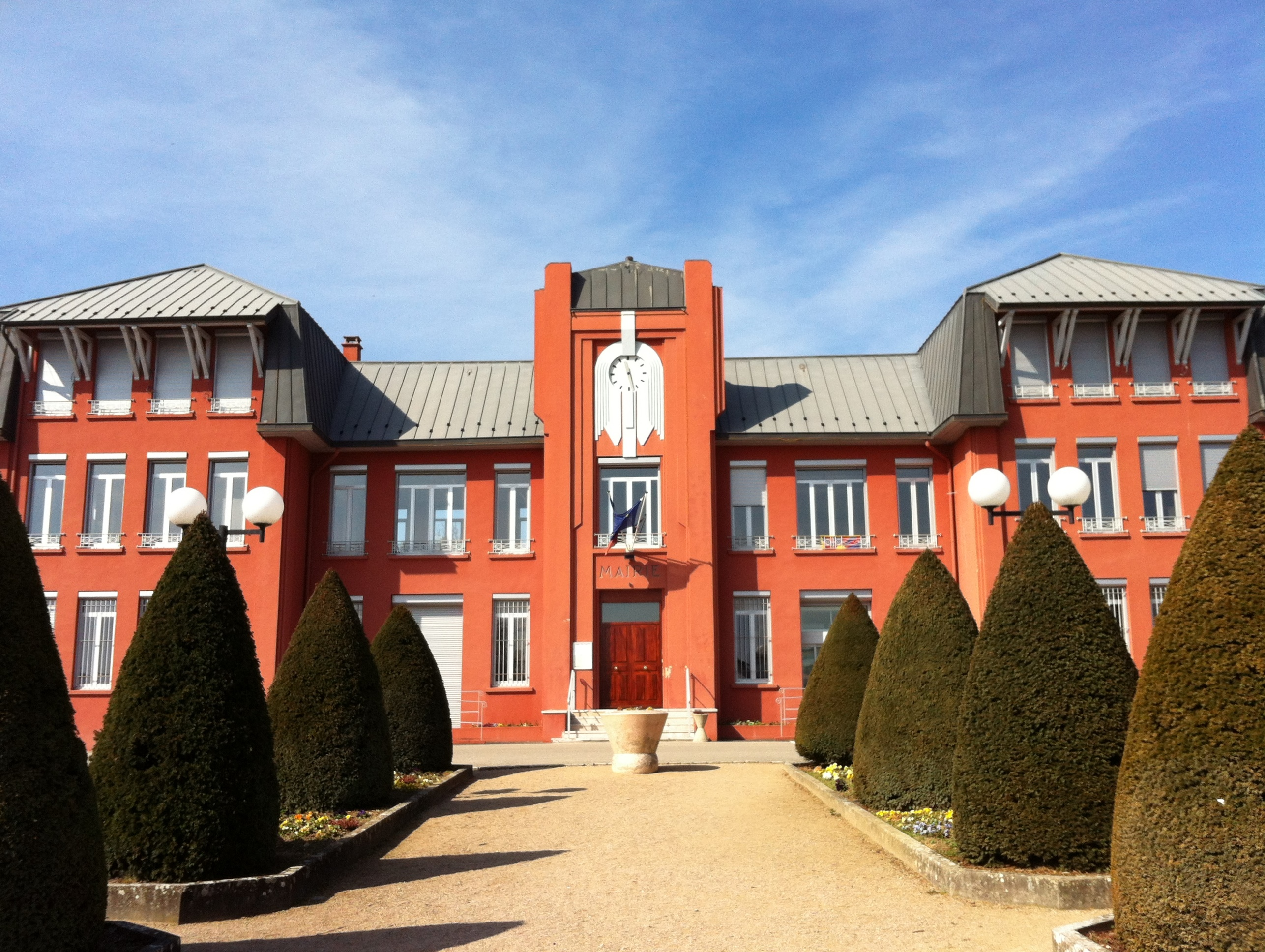
- Town hall

- Coat of arms
- Location of Saint-Maurice-de-Beynost
- Location within France Location within Auvergne-Rhône-Alpes
- Coordinates: 45°50′00″N 4°58′00″E
- Country: France
- Region: Auvergne-Rhône-Alpes
- Department: Ain
- Arrondissement: Bourg-en-Bresse
- Canton: Miribel
- Intercommunality: CC de Miribel et du Plateau

Government
  - Mayor (2026–32): Pierre Goubet
- Area^{1}: 6.99 km^{2} (2.70 sq mi)
- Elevation: 200 m (660 ft)
- Highest elevation: 315 m (1,033 ft)
- Lowest elevation: 172 m (564 ft)
- Population (2023): 4,332
  - Density: 620/km^{2} (1,610/sq mi)
- Time zone: UTC+01:00 (CET)
  - Summer (DST): UTC+02:00 (CEST)
- INSEE/Postal code: 01376 /01700
- Website: https://www.saint-maurice-de-beynost.fr/
- ^{1} French Land Register data, which excludes lakes, ponds, glaciers > 1 km^{2} (0.386 sq mi or 247 acres) and river estuaries.

Saint-Maurice-de-Beynost (French pronunciation: [sɛ̃ mɔʁis də beno]; literally "Saint-Maurice of Beynost") is a commune in the Ain department, in the Auvergne-Rhône-Alpes region, located at about 15 km (9 mi) from Lyon.

The commune is included in the canton of Miribel and in the intercommunality of communauté de communes de Miribel et du Plateau.

A small farming village at the beginning of the 20th century, the commune of Saint-Maurice-de-Beynost became an industrial town in the 1920s, following the construction of the second textile factory of the "Lyon Society of Artificial Silk". The need for workers in this factory led to a quadrupling of the population in just five years, between 1926 and 1931. Today, the factory, which belongs to the Japanese group Toray Industries, is still the main employer in the city with nearly five hundred employees.

The inhabitants of Saint-Maurice-de-Beynost are called Mauriciens.

== Population ==
Historical population

| Year | Pop. | ±% p.a. |
|---|---|---|
| 1793 | 262 | — |
| 1800 | 250 | −0.67% |
| 1806 | 252 | +0.13% |
| 1821 | 286 | +0.85% |
| 1831 | 322 | +1.19% |
| 1836 | 320 | −0.12% |
| 1841 | 320 | +0.00% |
| 1846 | 324 | +0.25% |
| 1851 | 320 | −0.25% |
| 1856 | 316 | −0.25% |
| 1861 | 311 | −0.32% |
| 1866 | 318 | +0.45% |
| 1872 | 307 | −0.59% |
| 1876 | 286 | −1.76% |
| 1881 | 263 | −1.66% |
| 1886 | 273 | +0.75% |
| 1891 | 287 | +1.01% |
| 1896 | 289 | +0.14% |
| 1901 | 300 | +0.75% |

| Year | Pop. | ±% p.a. |
|---|---|---|
| 1906 | 338 | +2.41% |
| 1911 | 318 | −1.21% |
| 1921 | 319 | +0.03% |
| 1926 | 365 | +2.73% |
| 1931 | 1,536 | +33.30% |
| 1936 | 1,576 | +0.52% |
| 1946 | 1,634 | +0.36% |
| 1954 | 1,797 | +1.20% |
| 1962 | 2,011 | +1.42% |
| 1968 | 2,695 | +5.00% |
| 1975 | 2,791 | +0.50% |
| 1982 | 3,503 | +3.30% |
| 1990 | 3,468 | −0.13% |
| 1999 | 4,020 | +1.65% |
| 2007 | 3,885 | −0.43% |
| 2012 | 3,863 | −0.11% |
| 2017 | 3,967 | +0.53% |
| 2023 | 4,332 | +1.48% |

Source: EHESS and INSEE (1968-2023)

== Sports ==
- Ain Sud Foot, football

== See also ==
- Communes of the Ain department
- Canton of Miribel
- Saint-Maurice-de-Beynost plant
