= EFI Automotive =

French enterprise

EFI Automotive (Electricfil automotive)
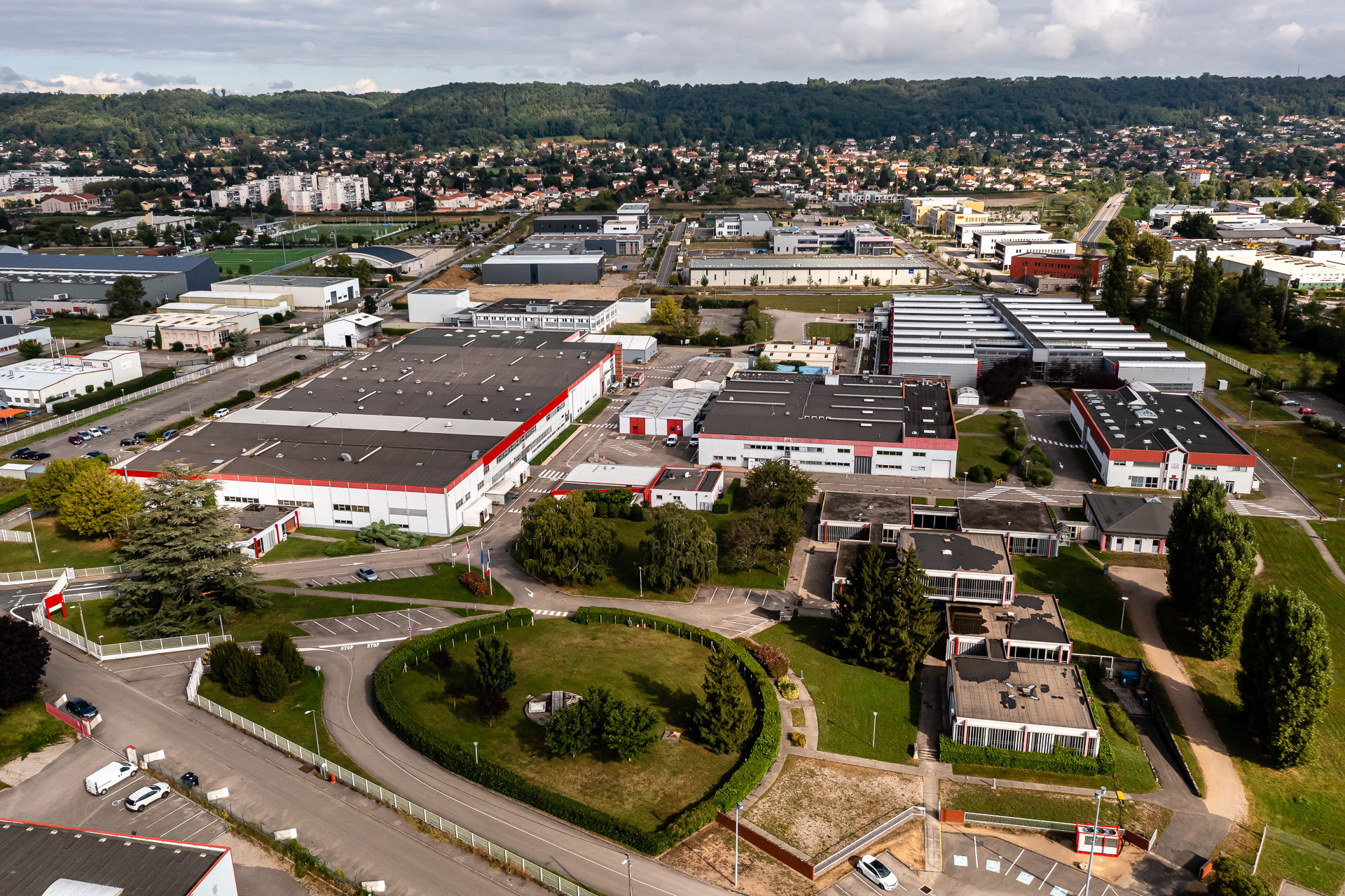
- Industry: Automotive, manufacturing
- Founded: 1936
- Headquarters: Beynost, France
- Key people: Béatrice Schmidt (2020- ) Patrick Thollin (1992-2020); Jean Thollin (1962-1992); Johanny Thollin (1936-1962)
- Products: Hall Effect Sensors, actuators, mechatronic modules
- Website: http://www.efiautomotive.com

EFI Automotive, previously Electricfil, is a French manufacturer of automotive engines and powertrain sensors. The company is headquartered in Beynost, France, and has factories in Joinville (France), China (Wuhan), Turkey (Istanbul) and the United States (Elkmont, Alabama).

== History ==
Electricfil was created in La Boisse by Johanny Thollin (1889–1962) in 1936 with the assistance of his stepfather Joseph Guinet. He was mayor of La Boisse from the year 1908 to 1938. He was then the head of a small Braided Fabric electrical cable factory in La Boisse and in 1968 the company relocated to Beynost.

In 2015, the company announced the creation of an incubator for innovative start-ups.

In 2021, EFI Automotive acquired the company Akéo Plus.

The company announced in 2021 that they would have a turnover of 202 million euros for the whole company (around 1,700 employees).
