= Antoine Rater =

French architect (1729–1794)

Antoine Rater (26 April 1729 in Lyon – 4 August 1794 in Miribel) was a French architect.

== Honours ==
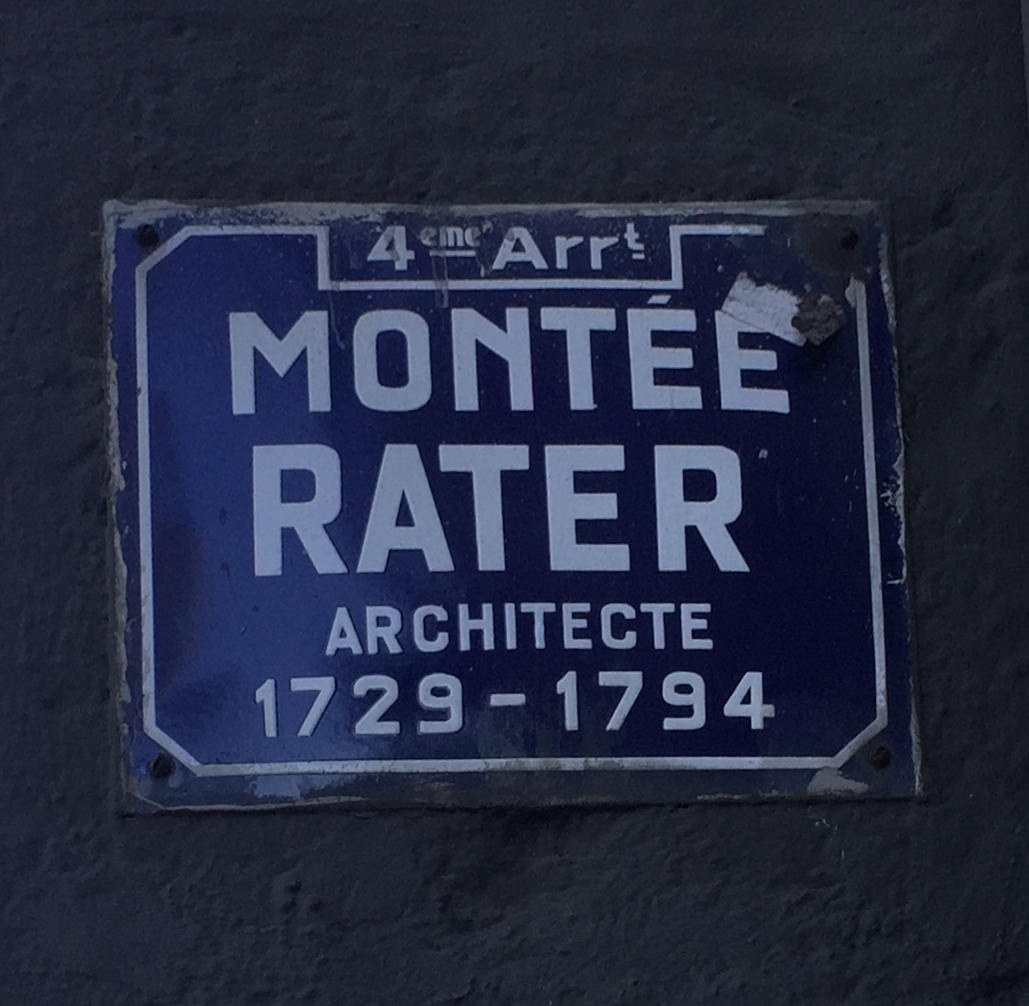
Street sign of Montée Rater (Lyon).

There is a street called Montée Rater at Lyon, France.
