= Mionnay =

Commune in Auvergne-Rhône-Alpes, France

- Commune
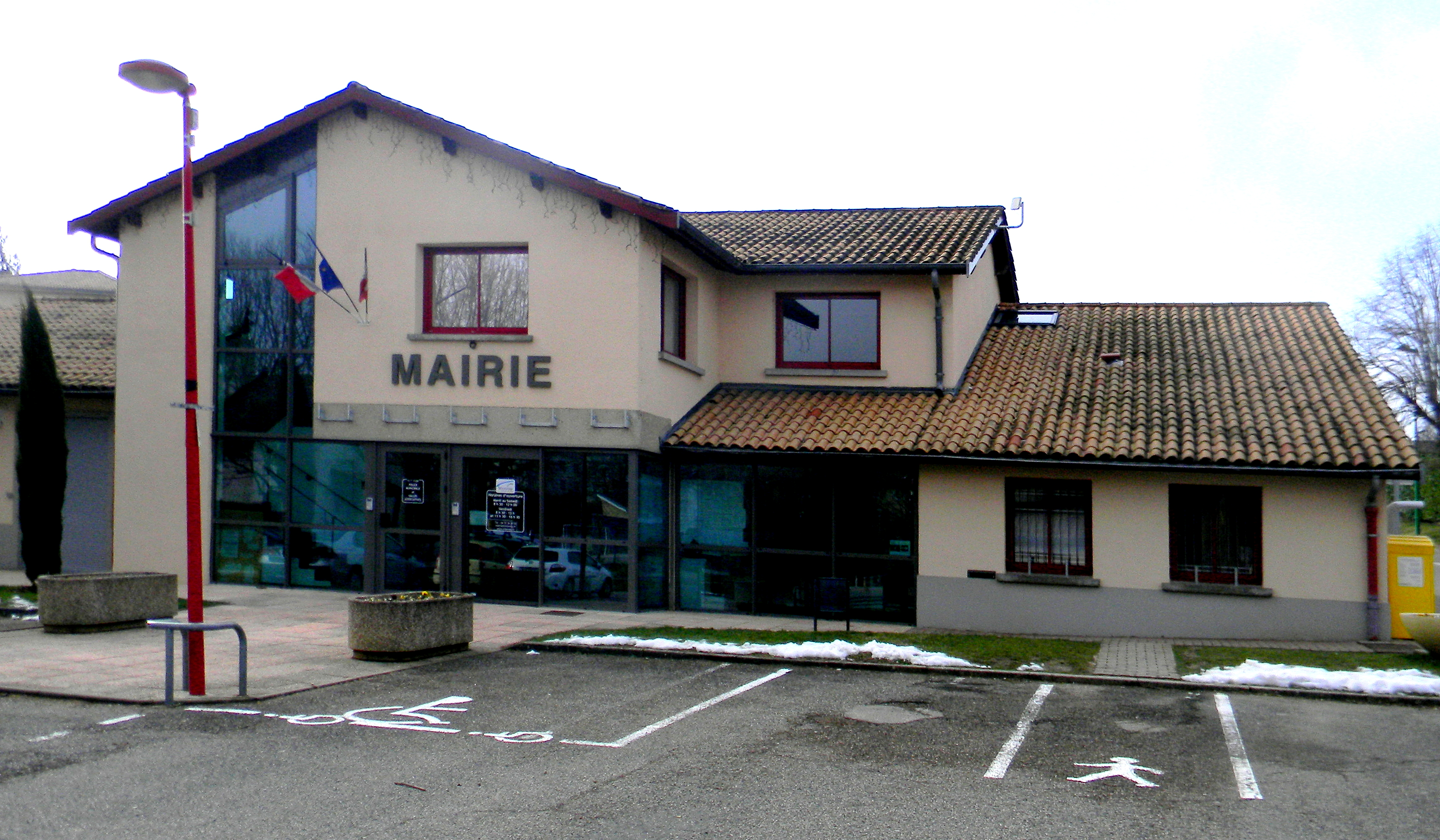
- Town hall
- Location of Mionnay
- Location within France Location within Auvergne-Rhône-Alpes
- Coordinates: 45°54′00″N 4°56′00″E
- Country: France
- Region: Auvergne-Rhône-Alpes
- Department: Ain
- Arrondissement: Bourg-en-Bresse
- Canton: Villars-les-Dombes

Government
  - Mayor (2026–32): Emilie Fleury
- Area^{1}: 19.2 km^{2} (7.4 sq mi)
- Elevation: 280 m (920 ft)
- Highest elevation: 321 m (1,053 ft)
- Lowest elevation: 267 m (876 ft)
- Population (2023): 2,294
  - Density: 119/km^{2} (309/sq mi)
- Time zone: UTC+01:00 (CET)
  - Summer (DST): UTC+02:00 (CEST)
- INSEE/Postal code: 01248 /01390
- ^{1} French Land Register data, which excludes lakes, ponds, glaciers > 1 km^{2} (0.386 sq mi or 247 acres) and river estuaries.

Mionnay (French pronunciation: [mjɔnɛ]; Arpitan: Mionnê) is a commune in the Ain department in eastern France. Mionnay station has rail connections to Bourg-en-Bresse and Lyon.

== Population ==
Historical population

Year	Pop.	±% p.a.
1793	273	—
1821	286	+0.17%
1846	380	+1.14%
1872	403	+0.23%
1901	414	+0.09%
1926	340	−0.78%
1946	305	−0.54%
1962	310	+0.10%
1968	350	+2.04%

Year	Pop.	±% p.a.
1975	444	+3.46%
1982	778	+8.34%
1990	1,103	+4.46%
1999	2,109	+7.47%
2007	2,132	+0.14%
2012	2,115	−0.16%
2017	2,100	−0.14%
2023	2,294	+1.48%

Source: EHESS and INSEE (1968-2023)

== See also ==
- Communes of the Ain department
