= Mionnay station =

Railway station in Mionnay, France

Coordinates: 45.8963°N 4.9194°E

Mionnay
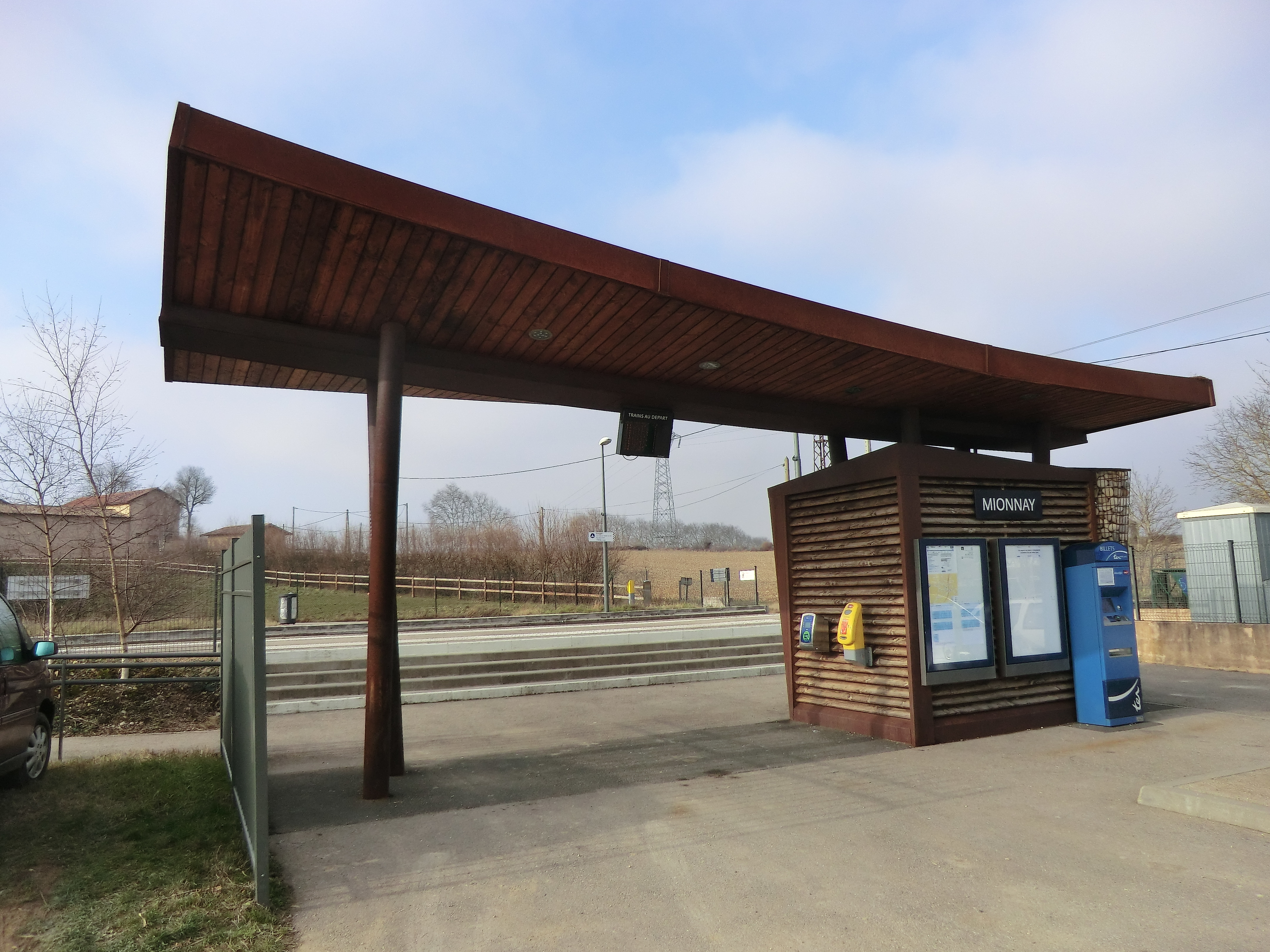
- Platform shelter and entrance to the station.

General information
- Location: Chemin de la forêt 01390 Mionnay; Ain; France
- Elevation: 288 m (945 ft)
- Owner: SNCF
- Operator: SNCF
- Line: Lyon–Bourg-en-Bresse railway
- Distance: 23.441 km
- Platforms: 2
- Tracks: 2

Other information
- Website: TER website

History
- Opened: 1866

Passengers
- 2019: 98,182

Services
Preceding station	TER Auvergne-Rhône-Alpes	Following station
Saint-André-de-Corcy towards Bourg-en-Bresse	32	Les Échets towards Lyon-Vaise
Location

Mionnay station (French: Gare de Mionnay) is a French railway station located in the commune of Mionnay, Ain department in the Auvergne-Rhône-Alpes region. It is located at kilometric point (KP) 23.441 on the Lyon–Bourg-en-Bresse railway, between Les Échets and Saint-André-de-Corcy stations.

As of 2020, the station is owned and operated by the SNCF and served by TER Auvergne-Rhône-Alpes trains.

== History ==
The station is located on a portion of railway which is double-tracked between Les Échets at KP 19.334 and Villars-les-Dombes station.

In 2019, the SNCF estimated that 98,182 passengers traveled through the station.

== Services ==
=== Passenger services ===
Classified as a PANG (point d'accès non géré), the station is unstaffed and equipped with automatic ticket dispensers.

=== Train services ===
As of 2021, the station is served by the following services:

- Regional Services (TER Auvergne-Rhône-Alpes 32) Bourg-en-Bresse ... Lyon.

=== Intermodality ===
In addition to a parking lot for passengers, the station is equipped with secure bicycle storage facilities.
