= Tramoyes =

Commune in Auvergne-Rhône-Alpes, France

- Commune
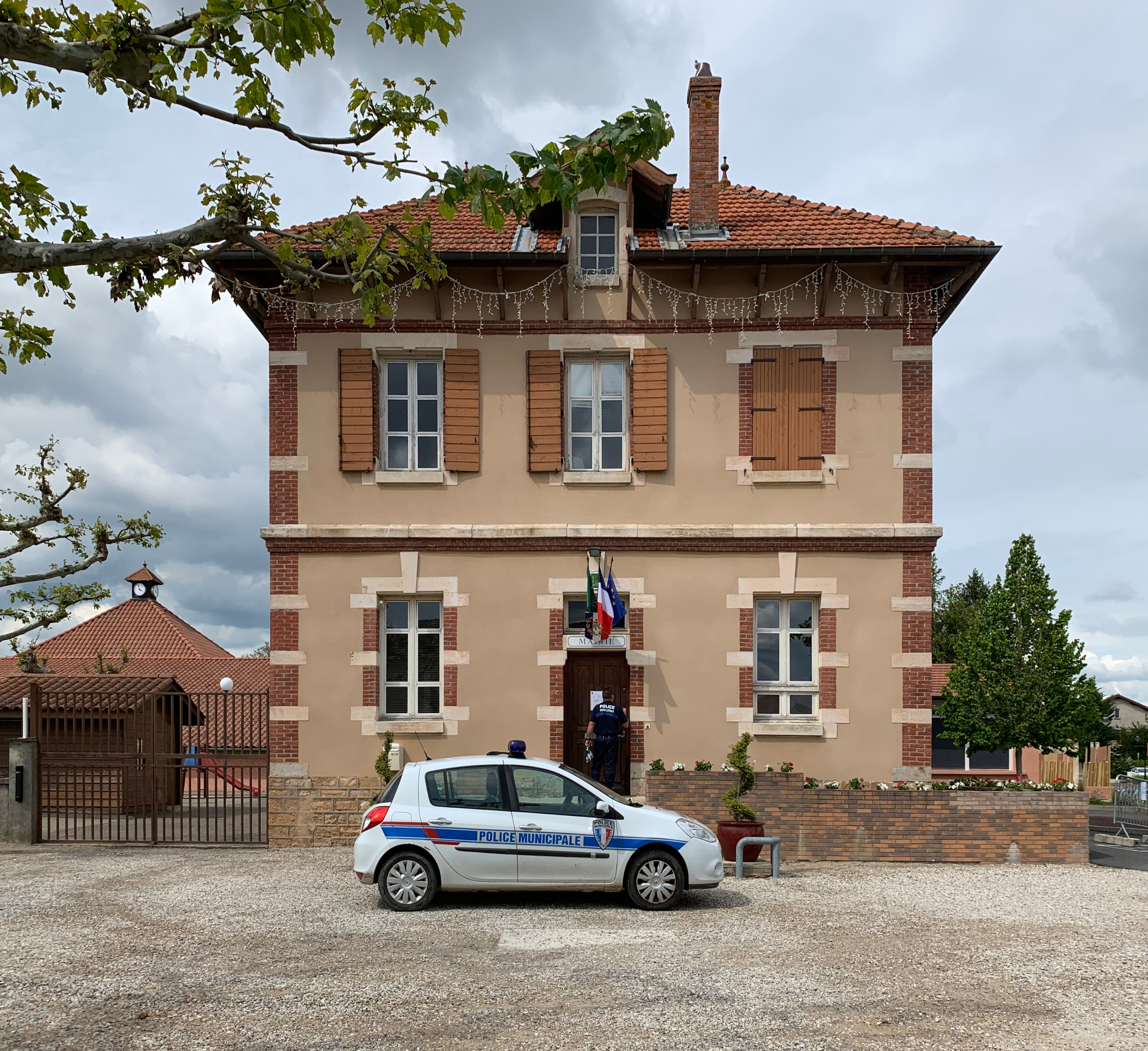
- Town hall

- Coat of arms
- Location of Tramoyes
- Location within France Location within Auvergne-Rhône-Alpes
- Coordinates: 45°52′00″N 4°58′00″E
- Country: France
- Region: Auvergne-Rhône-Alpes
- Department: Ain
- Arrondissement: Bourg-en-Bresse
- Canton: Miribel
- Intercommunality: CC Miribel et Plateau

Government
  - Mayor (2026–32): Xavier Deloche
- Area^{1}: 12.9 km^{2} (5.0 sq mi)
- Elevation: 300 m (980 ft)
- Highest elevation: 307 m (1,007 ft)
- Lowest elevation: 268 m (879 ft)
- Population (2023): 1,852
  - Density: 144/km^{2} (372/sq mi)
- Time zone: UTC+01:00 (CET)
  - Summer (DST): UTC+02:00 (CEST)
- INSEE/Postal code: 01424 /01390
- Website: https://www.tramoyes.fr/
- ^{1} French Land Register data, which excludes lakes, ponds, glaciers > 1 km^{2} (0.386 sq mi or 247 acres) and river estuaries.

Tramoyes (French pronunciation: [tʁamwa]; Arpitan: Tramôye) is a commune in the Ain department in eastern France.

== Population ==
Historical population
| Year | Pop. | ±% p.a. |
|---|---|---|
| 1968 | 364 | — |
| 1975 | 571 | +6.64% |
| 1982 | 788 | +4.71% |
| 1990 | 1,136 | +4.68% |
| 1999 | 1,527 | +3.34% |
| 2007 | 1,625 | +0.78% |
| 2012 | 1,648 | +0.28% |
| 2017 | 1,681 | +0.40% |
| 2023 | 1,852 | +1.63% |
Source: INSEE

== See also ==
- Communes of the Ain department
