= Saint-Maurice-de-Beynost plant =

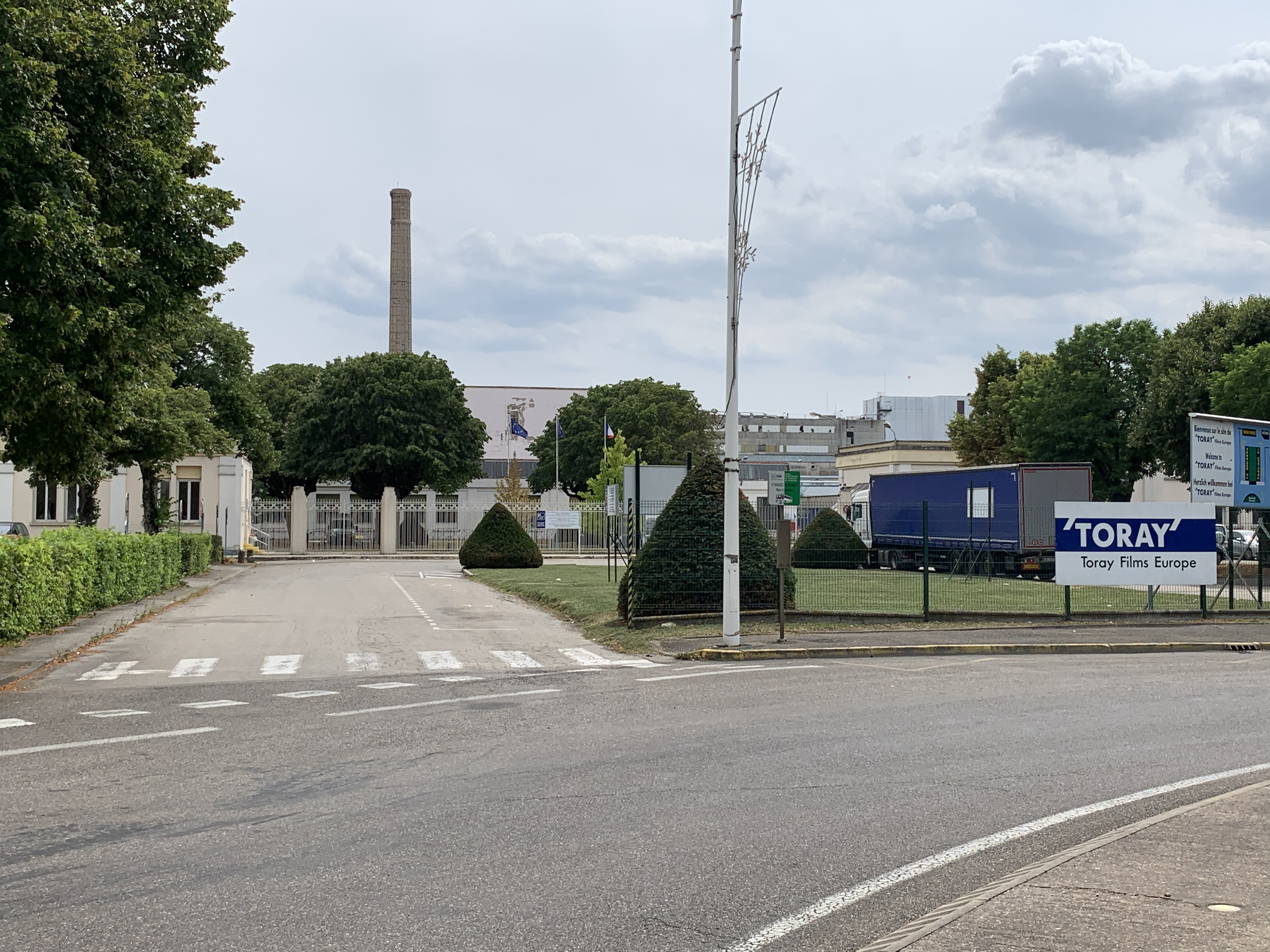
- Plant entrance in 2019
- Official name: Usine textile et chimique de Saint-Maurice-de-Beynost
- Country: France
- Location: Saint-Maurice-de-Beynost
- Coordinates: 45°49′25″N 4°58′53″E
- Status: Operational
- Commission date: 1930
- Owner
- Operator: Toray Films Europe
- Employees: 400 (2022)
- Annual revenue: 165,000,000 € (2021); 172,000,000 € (2009)

External links
- Website: www.torayfilms.eu
- Commons: Related media on Commons

The Saint-Maurice-de-Beynost textile and chemical plant, now known as the Toray de Saint-Maurice-de-Beynost plant, was founded in 1929 in Saint-Maurice-de-Beynost, in the Ain department. It was originally the second factory of Société lyonnaise de soie artificielle (SLSA), which soon became Société lyonnaise de textiles (SLT) and then Comptoir des textiles artificiels (CTA). In 1959, the plant was taken over by La Cellophane and converted to chemical production (paper film). La Cellophane was subsequently taken over by Rhône-Poulenc, and since 1996 by Toray Films Europe.

Construction of the plant in the late 1920s, followed by actual production, led to a large influx of workers to Saint-Maurice-de-Beynost; the population quintupled in five years, from around 300 in 1926 to over 1,500 in 1931. The presence of the factory had a strong influence on the town, both in terms of housing and social life. In 2022, the plant remains Saint-Maurice-de-Beynost's main employer, with approximatively employees.

== History ==
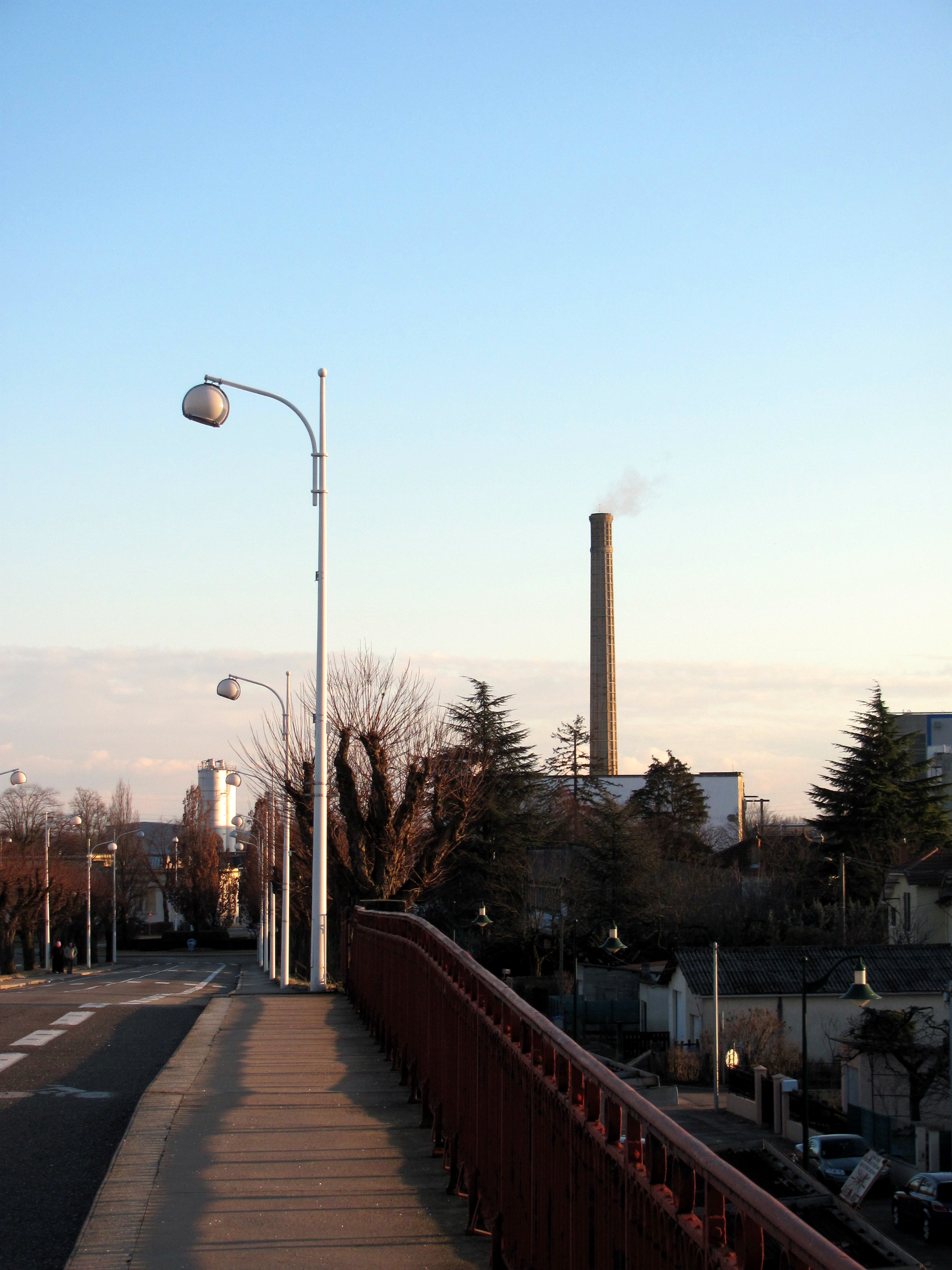
View of the factory's current chimney from Avenue Maurice Cusin, which spans the railway line in Saint-Maurice-de-Beynost

=== From creation to closure in 1959 ===
The 1920s saw the installation of new textile factories in the Lyon Region, particularly in Saint-Maurice-de-Beynost. Maurice Cusin was looking for a site in the Lyon region to establish the second factory of the Société lyonnaise de soie artificielle (SLSA), after the one in Décines created in 1922. In 1928, the municipal council of Saint-Maurice-de-Beynost spread a favorable opinion on the installation of this factory on municipal territory. There was some local reluctance (for fear of nuisance from industrial activity), but despite this, Maurice Cusin bought 50 hectares in Les Brotteaux, between the Miribel canal and the Lyon-Geneva railway line.

Construction of the factory began in 1928 and was completed in 1930. Artificial silk production began in 1930. The 110-meter-high chimney was built in 1928; it was blown up in 1972. Another, smaller chimney already existed; it was preserved and can still be seen today.

In 1930, workers of mainly Armenian and Polish origin left SLSA's first plant (in Décines) to work in Saint-Maurice-de-Beynost. The workforce was mainly foreign, coming mainly from the Middle East, Poland, Spain and Portugal. In the 1960s, a second wave of immigration to meet labor needs saw the plant's new workers come mainly from North Africa.

In 1934, SLSA became Société lyonnaise de textiles (SLT), still managed by Maurice Cusin. Like many factories in France, May–June 1936 was a period of intense strikes at the plant, which was even occupied by workers for a time.

From 1956 onwards, the plant's activity declined, mainly due to increased competition, leading to the absorption of the two SLS plants by Comptoir des Textiles Artificiels (CTA) in 1957. The Décines plant then had 1,100 employees. Finally, on 2 February 1959, the closure of both the Décines and Saint-Maurice-de-Beynost plants was announced for 1 April of that year. All employees (560 in 1959) were laid off. In April 1959, production ceased and the workshops were effectively closed.

=== CIPSO then La Cellophane ===
In 1959, the plant's assets were sold to the Compagnie industrielle de plastiques semi-ouvrés de Paris (CIPSO): ten employees remained on site to prepare the premises for the buyer. A new activity was decided for the site, which resumed in 1960 : the production of Terphane, the trade name of polyethylene terephthalate, i.e. saturated polyester. Between the end of CTA and CIPSO's takeover of the plant, most of the factory's workers were reclassified to other plants in the region, notably Vaise. When CIPSO began operations, former CTA employees were asked to return to work at Saint-Maurice-de-Beynost.

In 1966, CIPSO was absorbed by La Cellophane, giving the plant its local nickname: "La Cellophane". In 1967, business was booming: the factory brought in immigrant workers, mainly from Morocco and Portugal.

==== Strikes in 1967 and 1968 ====
1967 was also marked by a major strike lasting three weeks from 15 March: the two main demands were for a performance bonus and a hoped-for increase in the basic wage. From 16 March onwards, picket lines were set up at every entrance to the plant, leading to the occupation of the factory, which was no longer accessible. On 17 March, elected representatives – notably the Ain deputy Émile Dubuis and his successor Guy de La Verpillière in the 3rd constituency from April 1967 – offered to mediate. From 19 March onwards, the strikers organized themselves and received help from the town hall, which distributed vouchers to families; the HLM office was also contacted to ask for the rent payment date to be postponed. Until 23 March, meetings were held between the Ain prefect Georges Dupoizat de Villemont, the labor inspector, the mayor of Saint-Maurice-de-Beynost André Trichard and (successively) the CGT and CFDT elected representatives, then the plant management. From the 23rd onwards, the strike intensified: on 30 March, a large demonstration was organized in Bourg-en-Bresse. Two days later, on 1 April, a second demonstration was organized in Saint-Maurice-de-Beynost. On 3 April, strikers' representatives were received by La Cellophane management in Paris. A conciliation meeting was finally organized on 5 April at 3 p.m. at the town hall; Michel Branciard wrote these words to describe how the meeting unfolded, from the strikers' point of view:

From 3 p.m. to 10 p.m., pessimism reigned, with negotiations making little progress, except for the productivity bonus. At 10 p.m., the meeting was suspended and a visit was made to the picket line, where the men were becoming increasingly nervous; the delegates had to reason with them to avoid blunders. – Michel Branciard, La CFDT dans l'Ain, évolution depuis 1920

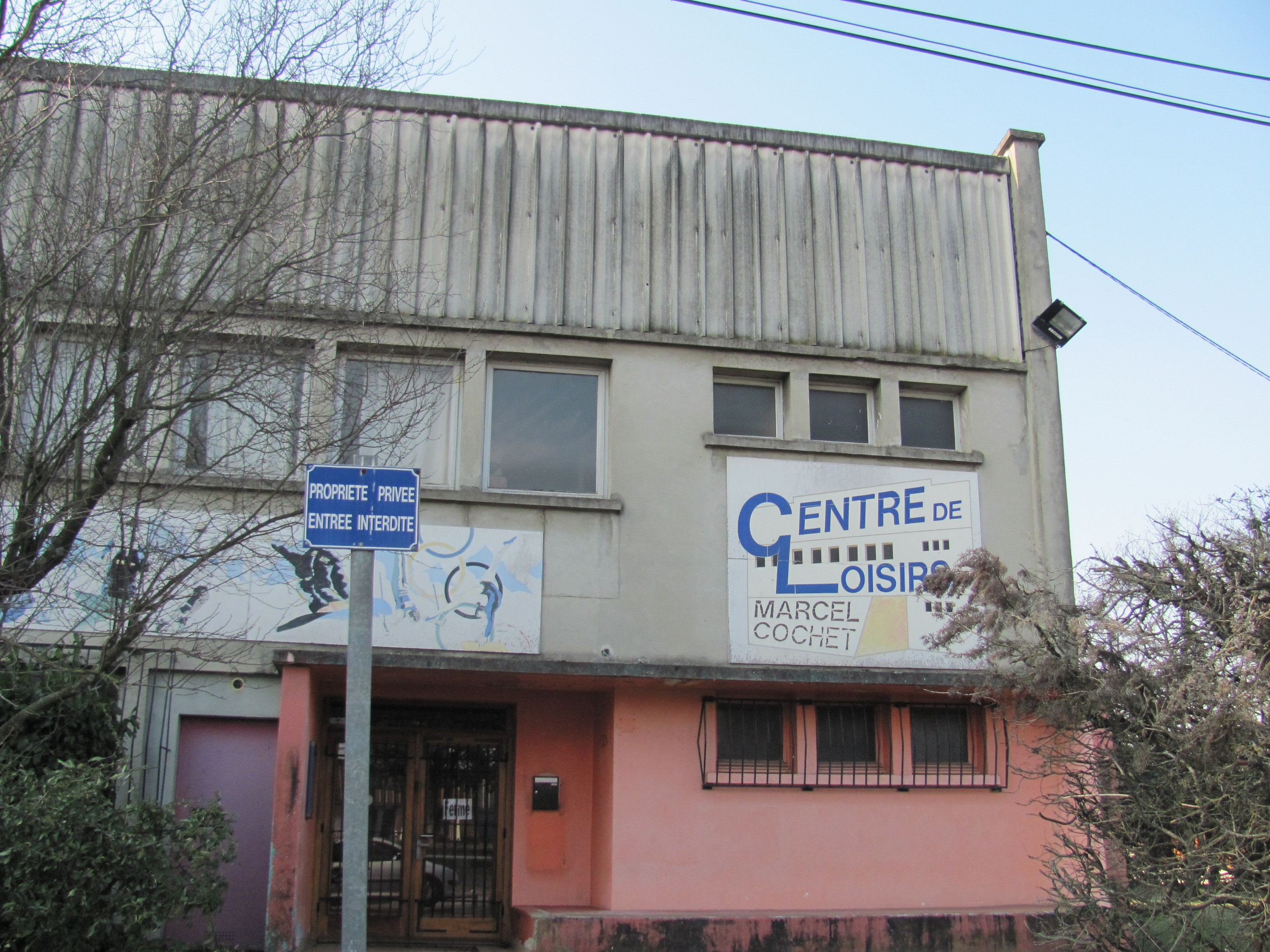
The Marcel-Cochet Centre, one of the achievements of the strike of March–April 1967

Finally, an agreement was reached after midnight: it still had to be submitted to the strikers' general meeting organized the following day, on 6 April. The text (including wage increases, improvements to the performance bonus and a number of points relating to social works) was approved at the end of the AGM. Among the points relating to social works was the provision of dedicated premises, to be known as the Marcel-Cochet Centre. This existed until the summer of 2013, when it was merged with the Artémis social center. In 2022, the site is under construction for a residential building.

In 1968, as in all factories in France, an unlimited strike was voted by a large majority of employees; nevertheless, the factory's "big strike" was probably that of March–April 1967.

==== The end of La Cellophane ====
From 1973 to 1974 onwards, due to the first oil crisis and competition from polypropylene, the business faltered20 . A redundancy plan was considered and announced to staff, leading to a major strike from 13 to 25 February 1976. In 1979, La Cellophane's Paris headquarters were sold, with management moving to La Part-Dieu and then to Saint-Maurice-de-Beynost. Despite these efforts, the company was absorbed by Rhône-Poulenc, which split it into two entities: Rhône-Poulenc Films and Rhône-Poulenc Systèmes.

=== Since 1979 ===
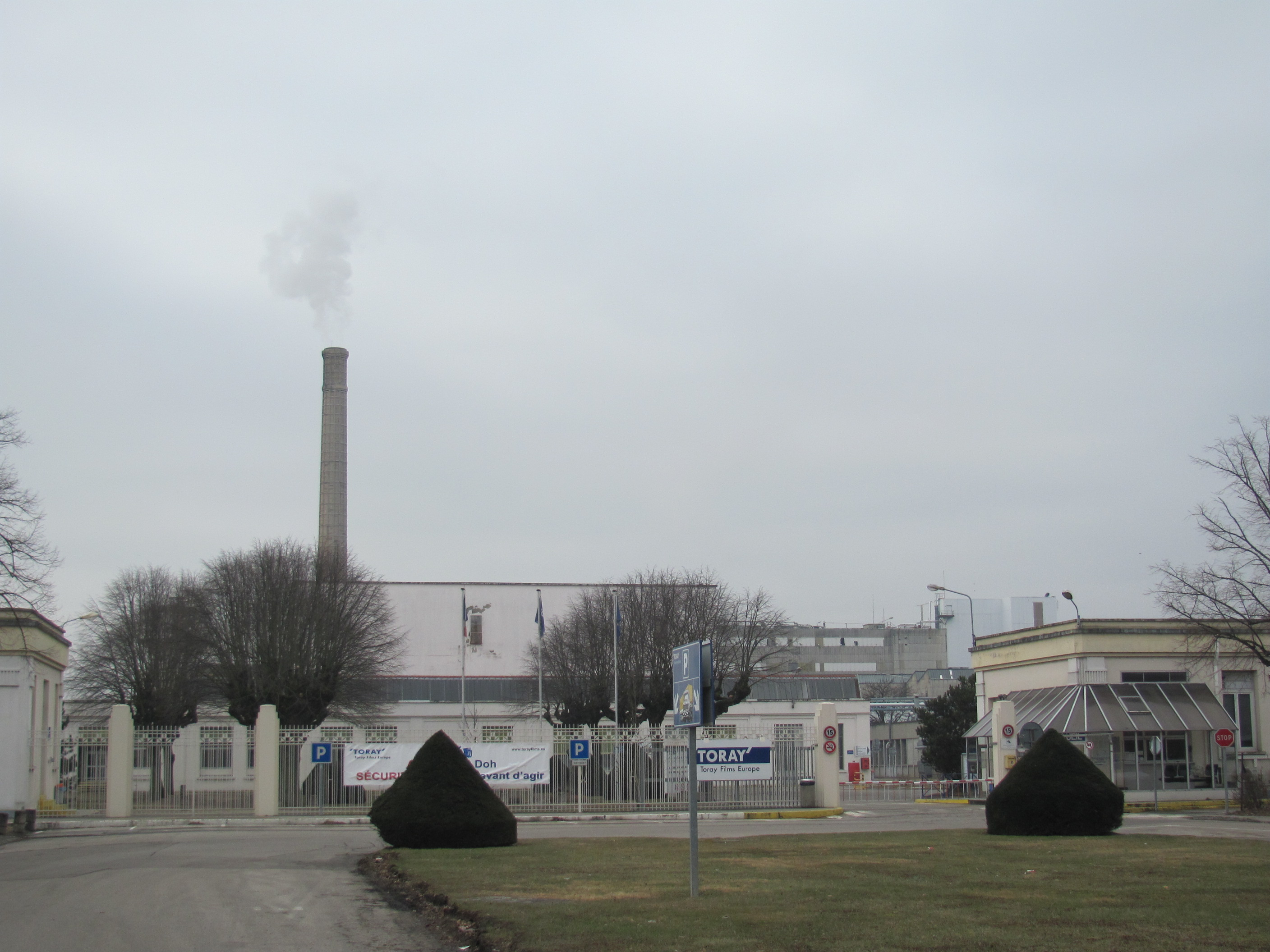
View of the Place d'Arménie, where the factory entrance is located

From 1979, the plant operated under the aegis of Rhône-Poulenc Films. Rhône-Poulenc was actively looking for a buyer for its Rhône-Poulenc Films business, and after initially considering Du Pont de Nemours, the Films business was sold to Toray in 1996. This involved a 25% reduction in the workforce, from 600 to 450 employees. This reduction in the number of employees led to strikes, sometimes lasting several days, as in February 2002, due to the understaffing observed by the unions. In 2009, the plant generated sales of 172 million euros. At the end of 2011, 470 employees were working at the Saint-Maurice-de-Beynost plant.

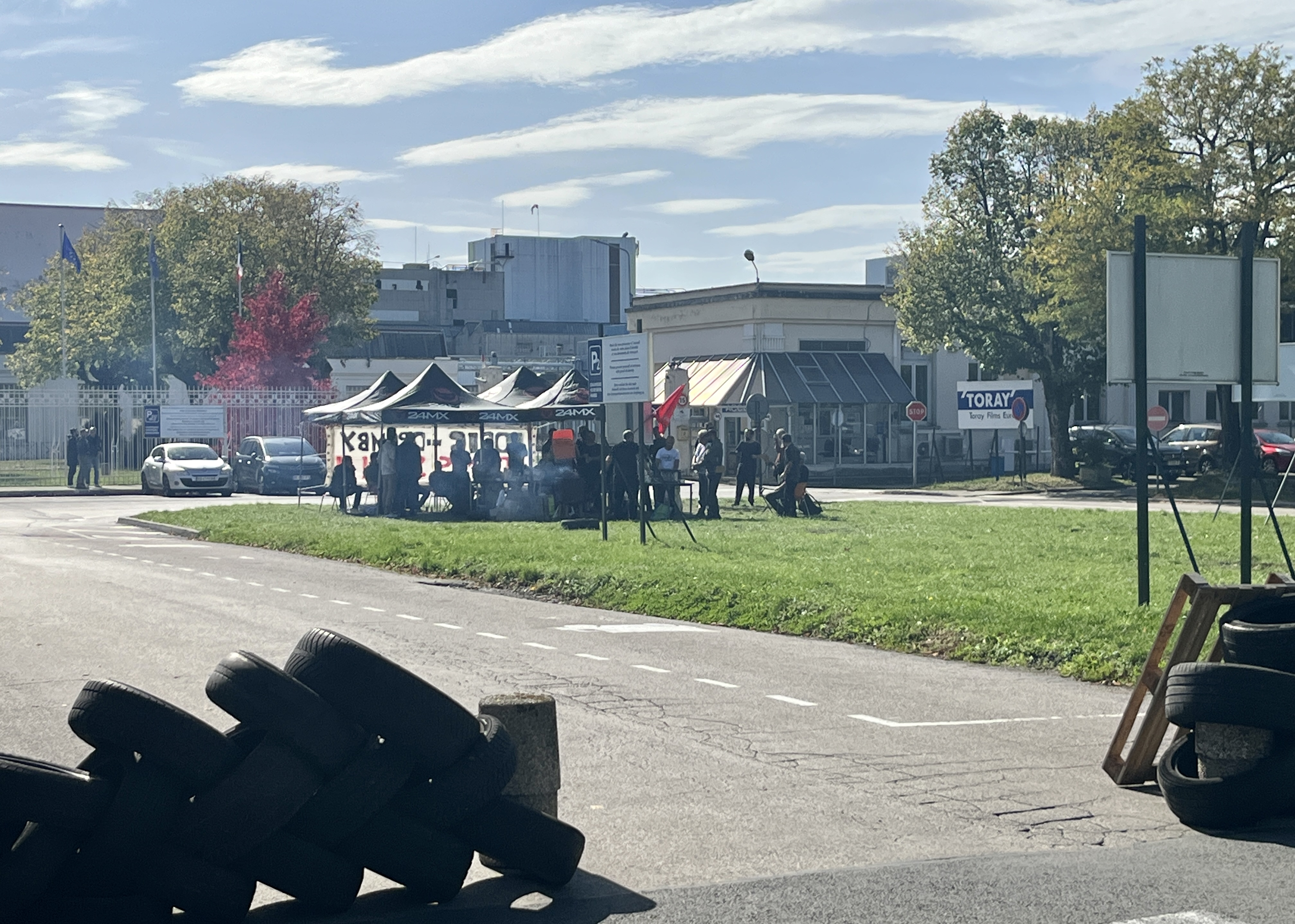
Strike lasting several weeks at the plant in October 2022

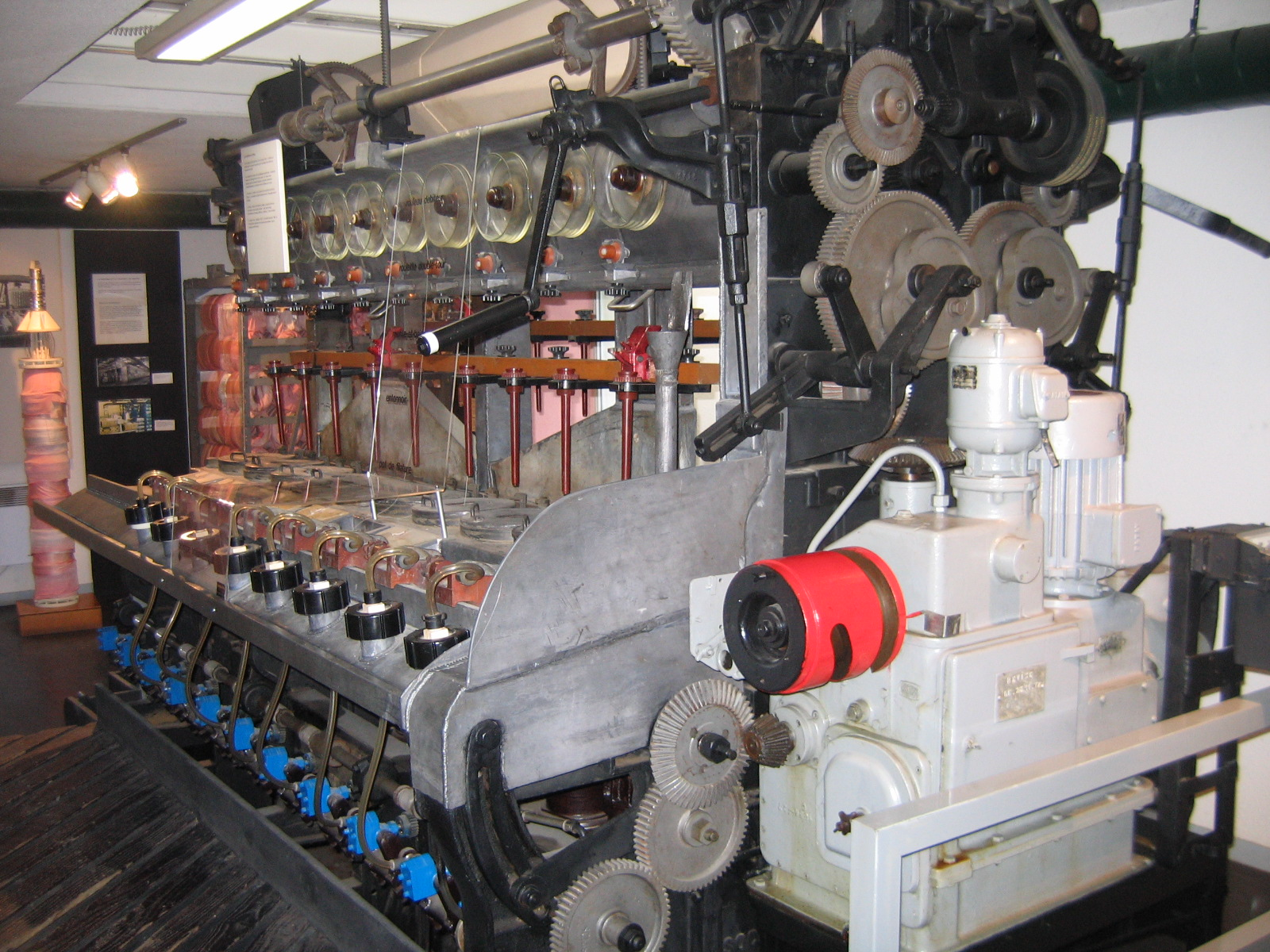
Spinning machine used for the spinning stage (Musée de la Viscose, Échirolles)

== Successive productions ==
=== Artificial silk ===
The raw material for production is cellulose, generally sourced from Northern Europe and delivered to the factory in sheet form. The manufacturing process for artificial silk is as follows: pressing of the cellulose sheets, including the addition of soda; the result of the pressing is then ground and mixed with carbon sulfide. The resulting liquid paste is called viscose. After a few days' waiting, this viscose is ready to be processed in the silk mill.

This last stage consists of creating strands using a draw plate, which are then wound onto bobbins. Once wound, the strands are washed and dried, before being milled to create silk threads.

=== Plastic film ===
When CIPSO took over the factory in 1960, the production of artificial silk was abandoned in favor of plastic derivatives. CIPSO consolidated all its production of plastic films, profiles and sheets at Saint-Maurice-de-Beynost: production at Bezons (Terphane) on the one hand, and at Roussillon and Vénissieux (Rhodialite) on the other, was transferred to the plant; new production, such as polyethylene tubes, was added. The oil crisis and competition from polypropylene led to a slowdown in activity, despite the filing of a number of patents obtained as a result of research carried out at the plant (e.g. Composite polyester films and process for producing the same in 1975). Nevertheless, economic difficulties encouraged the sale of the plant to Rhône-Poulenc: in 1979, under the name Rhône-Poulenc Films, the plant was the only one in the group to produce polyester film (plastic film).

In 2022, Axens and Toray Films Europe launch a study for a chemical recycling plant for polyethylene terephthalate at the Saint-Maurice-de-Beynost site.

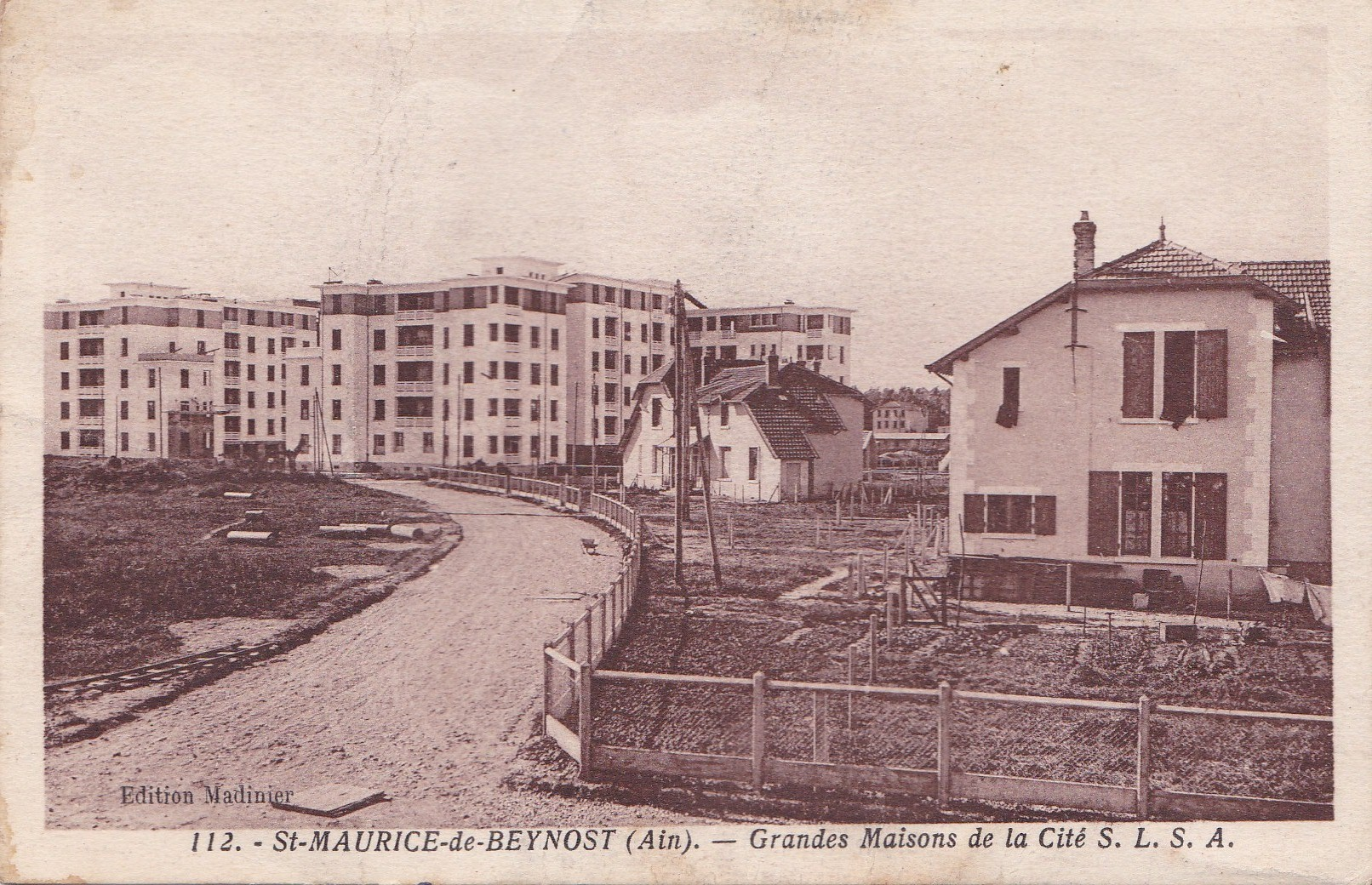
View of the "cité de la soie" in the 1930s: large buildings and examples of workers' houses.

== Installation and consequences ==
=== Housing ===
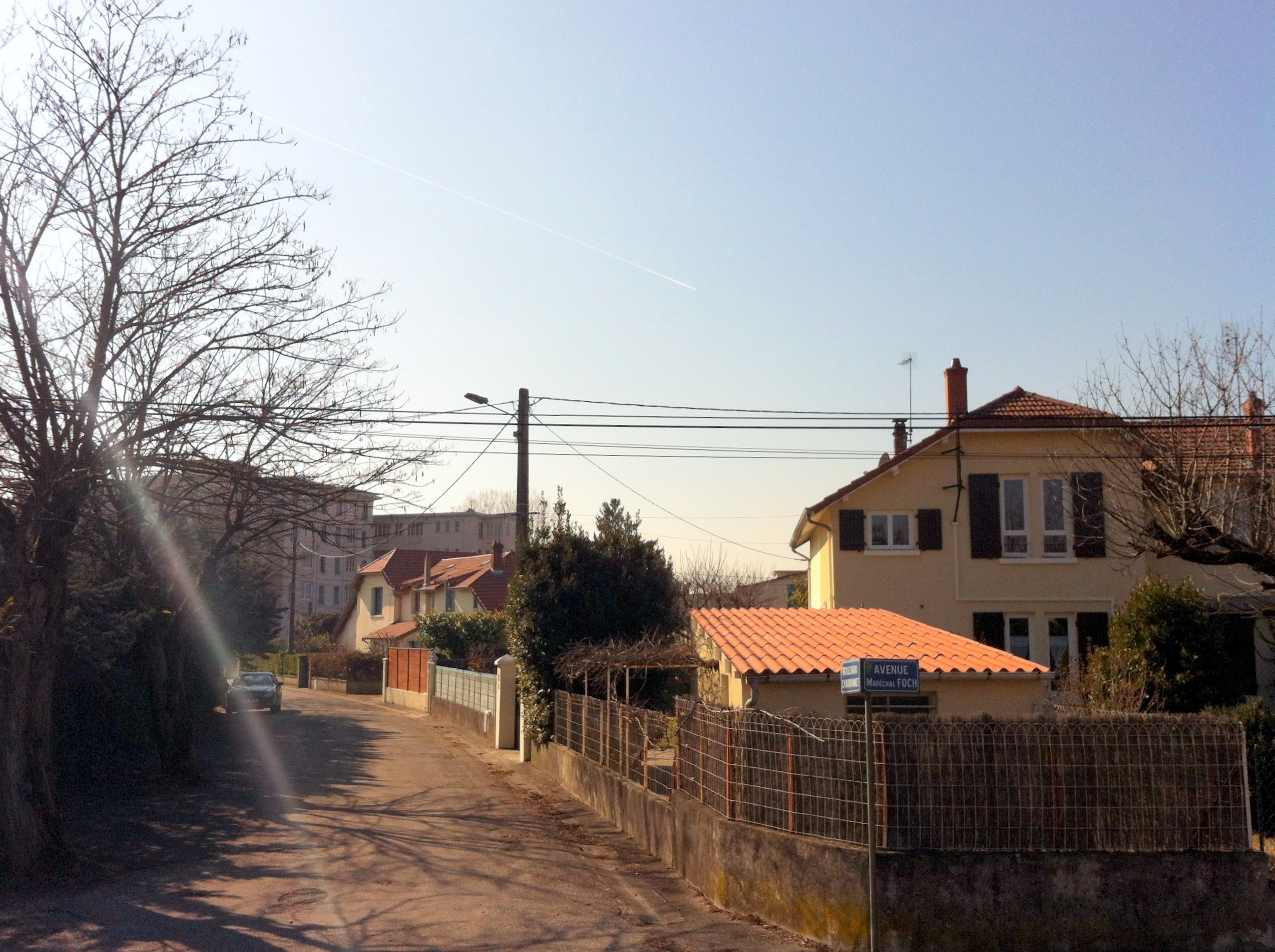
View of the "cité de la soie" in the 2010s; photograph from the corner of avenue Foch and boulevard Chardonnet

The massive influx of people to Saint-Maurice-de-Beynost in 1929 quickly raised the question of housing. On the initiative of Maurice Cusin and with a somewhat paternalistic approach, the "cité de la soie" or "cité Toray" was built on a 45-hectare site. It comprises large apartment buildings and a series of small terraced houses, each with a small garden. There are four or five main housing types in Silk City. The spirit in which this neighborhood was built can be illustrated by a brochure published by the factory in 1933:

The workers find here a level of comfort they have never known before. Every apartment has electricity and running water. They rival each other in the care they take of their homes and gardens, and most have a small farmyard.

– Factory presentation brochure, 1933.

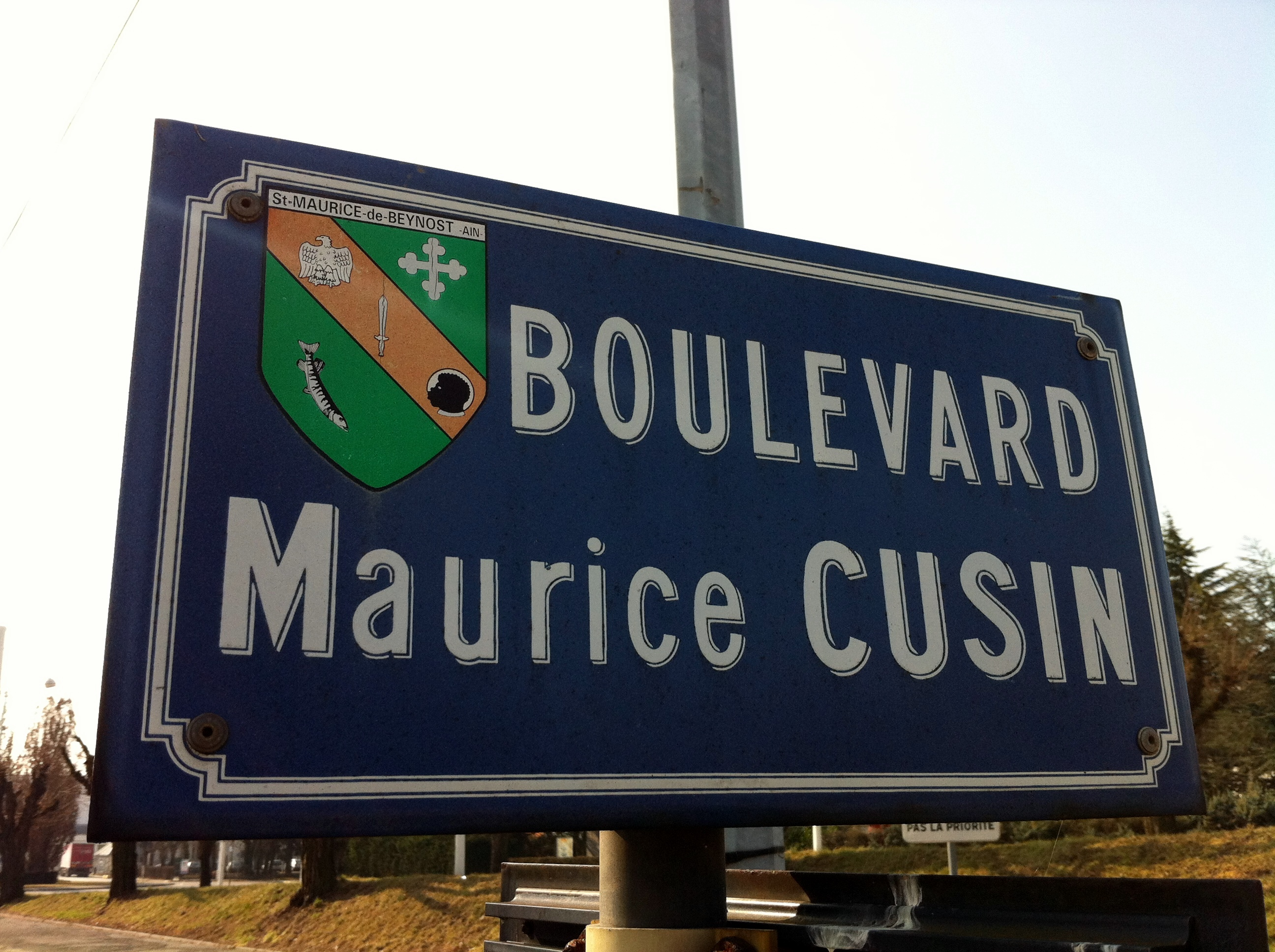
A sign on the boulevard Maurice-Cusin

The presence of the plant also led to a certain improvement in living conditions in the housing estate: with the Rhone pumped by SLT (for its industrial needs), running drinking water was free in the housing estate; time wasted waiting at level crossings led to the construction of a bridge over the railway line, linking the housing estate to Saint-Maurice Le-Haut. For a long time, this bridge was known as the "Cusin Bridge" and is now called Avenue Maurice-Cusin. Towards the end of the 1960s, two buildings for bachelors, with a total of twenty rooms, were built to house staff.

Subsequently, post-war needs for collective housing led to the creation of the "Les Folliets" district in the 1960s, in the area known as "le pré Folliets".

Work began in 1962–1963 with the construction of two buildings, each with thirty-two and twenty-four units. Between 1965 and 1967, four further buildings were built. Finally, between 1973 and 1977, three more buildings were erected, bringing the total to 276 homes by 1980, housing a third of the municipal population (then around 3,700 inhabitants in 1980). Today, the neighborhood is Saint-Maurice-de-Beynost's main public housing district, covering an area of 5 ha.

=== Daily life ===
==== Safety ====
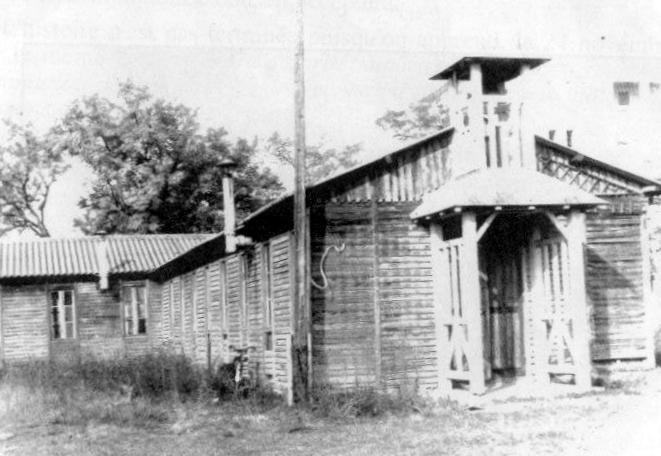
Notre-Dame-des-Bruyères chapel in Saint-Maurice-de-Beynost

The presence of the plant in the municipality implies an industrial risk that is covered by various safety plans, including a municipal safety plan. Historically, in terms of personal safety, the construction of the plant resulted in the presence of a gendarmerie in Saint-Maurice-de-Beynost. Indeed, on 23 November 1929, the municipal council, concerned about the arrival of a new population in the commune, approved the creation of a fixed gendarmerie post, which would eventually be located on Avenue des Îles. In 1934, the post's uselessness was recognized, and its abolition was announced, despite the opposition of the town council led by Mayor Amédée Bardet:

The maintenance of the gendarmerie post is justified by the existence of a large working-class population, the majority of whom are foreigners. – Saint-Maurice-de-Beynost town council minutes, April 28, 1934

However, the gendarmerie post was abolished in 1934.

==== Worship ====
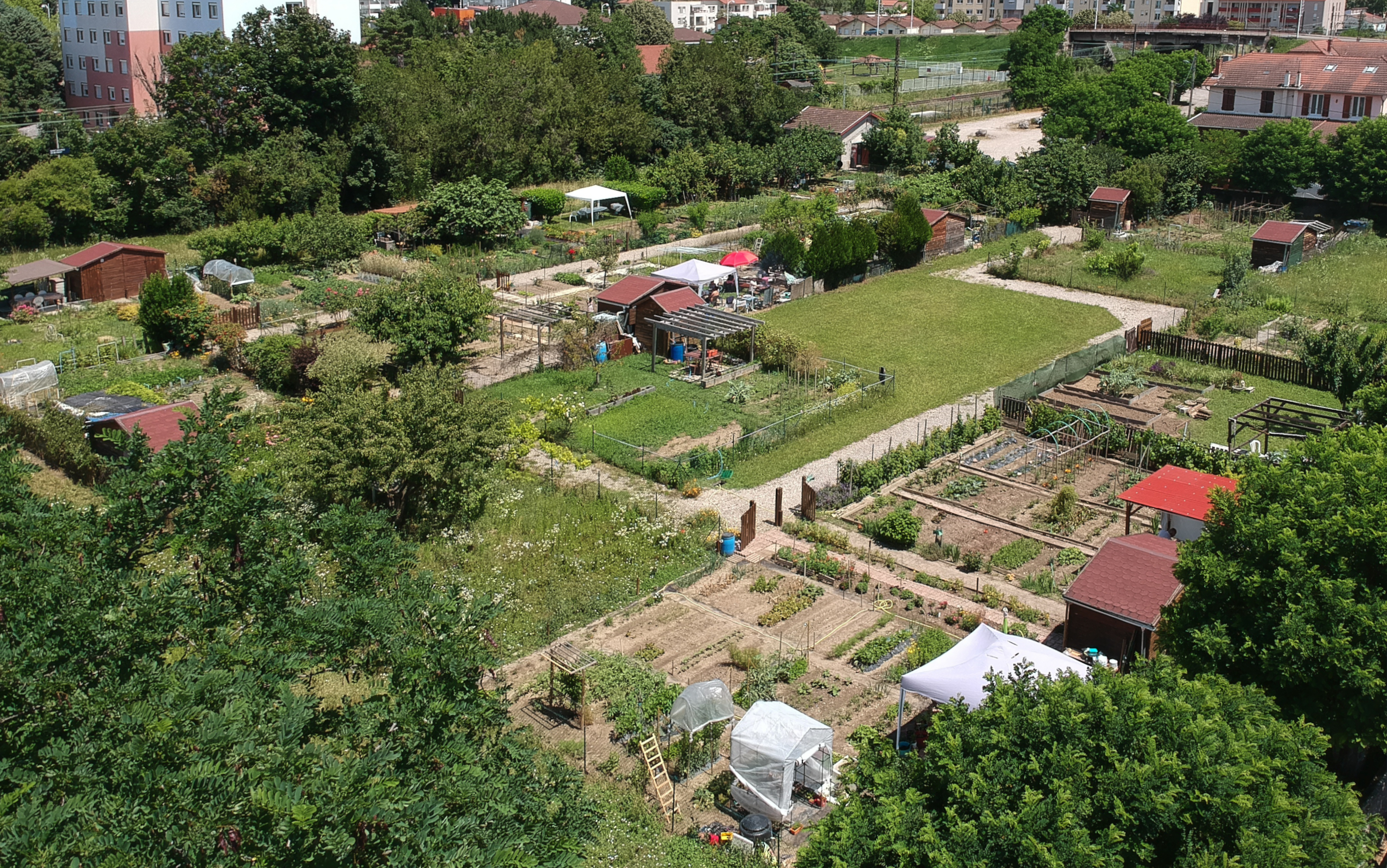
The Saint-Maurice-de-Beynost allotment gardens, formerly known as the Stade Roland-Schmitt and the Stade de la soie

As the Saint-Maurice church could only hold around a hundred people, a wooden chapel was quickly built in 1930 to accommodate the workers. It was demolished in 1972, two years after the construction of Notre-Dame church in Saint-Maurice Le-Bas. Dedicated to Notre-Dame-des-Bruyères, it was located at the current site of the factory canteen.

The installation of this chapel was apparently favored by Maurice Cusin: the geographical concentration of housing, the place of worship and all ancillary activities around the factory, corresponded to his paternalistic vision. The factory's Armenians, of Orthodox faith, sometimes attended the (Catholic) chapel, even though the small Armenian church of Sainte-Marie in Décines was available as early as 1932, unlike the Armenian church of Saint-Jacques in Lyon, which was consecrated late, in 1963.

==== Sports ====
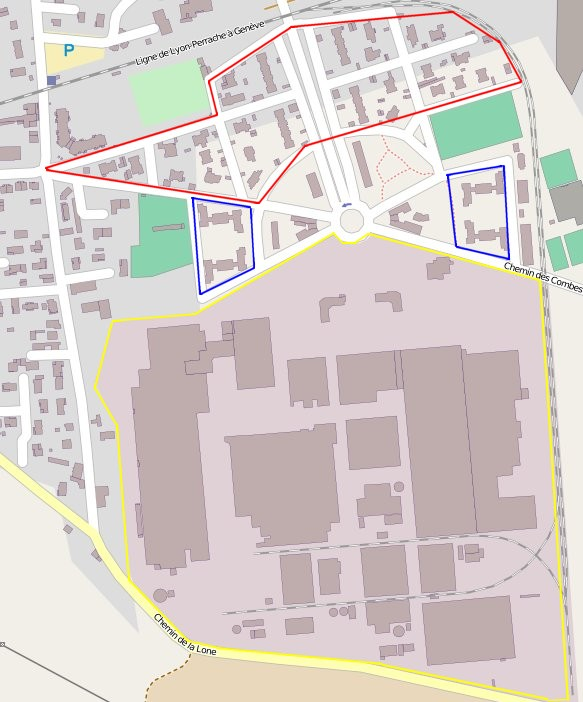
Yellow: Perimeter of the factory. Red: Perimeter of the workers' houses in the Cité de la soie. Blue: Perimeter of the large buildings in the Cité de la soie

The Olympique Saint-Maurice (OSM) soccer club was officially founded on 28 February 1944; its creation was largely financed and encouraged by Maurice Cusin: in 1947, his son Marcel Cusin was even asked to take over the management of the club, a request he accepted. The factory also financed the construction of the Stade de la soie, which was inaugurated on 27 September 1947, to host a match between OSM and Servette de Genève. Lighting was installed, which was quite exceptional for the time, and ASSE professionals came to Saint-Maurice-de-Beynost to familiarize themselves with this novelty.

== Personalities linked to the plant ==
- Jean Chosson, mayor of Saint-Maurice-de-Beynost from 1945 to 1965, was a factory employee;
- Hippolyte Doury, president of Olympique Saint-Maurice, worked for the factory for many years. The street running alongside the former OSM stadium bears his name;
- Vincent Goutagny, French politician and trade unionist. An employee of the plant since the late 1990s and a resident of Saint-Maurice-de-Beynost, he has been a candidate for Lutte Ouvrière in several elections, including legislative elections in 2012 and 2017, and regional elections in 2010 and 2015.

== Bibliography ==
- Schwartz, Annie (2000). Saint-Maurice-de-Beynost d'hier à aujourd'hui (in French). Maison des chômeurs de l'Agenais. ISBN 2-9515418-0-5.
- Ouvrage collectif (1995). Richesses touristiques et archéologiques du canton de Miribel : Miribel, Beynost, Neyron, Saint-Maurice-de-Beynost, Thil (in French). Patrimoine des pays de l'Ain.
- Branciard, Michel (1986). La CFDT dans l'Ain, évolution depuis 1920 (in French). CFDT-Ain.
