= Patrick Chaize =

French politician

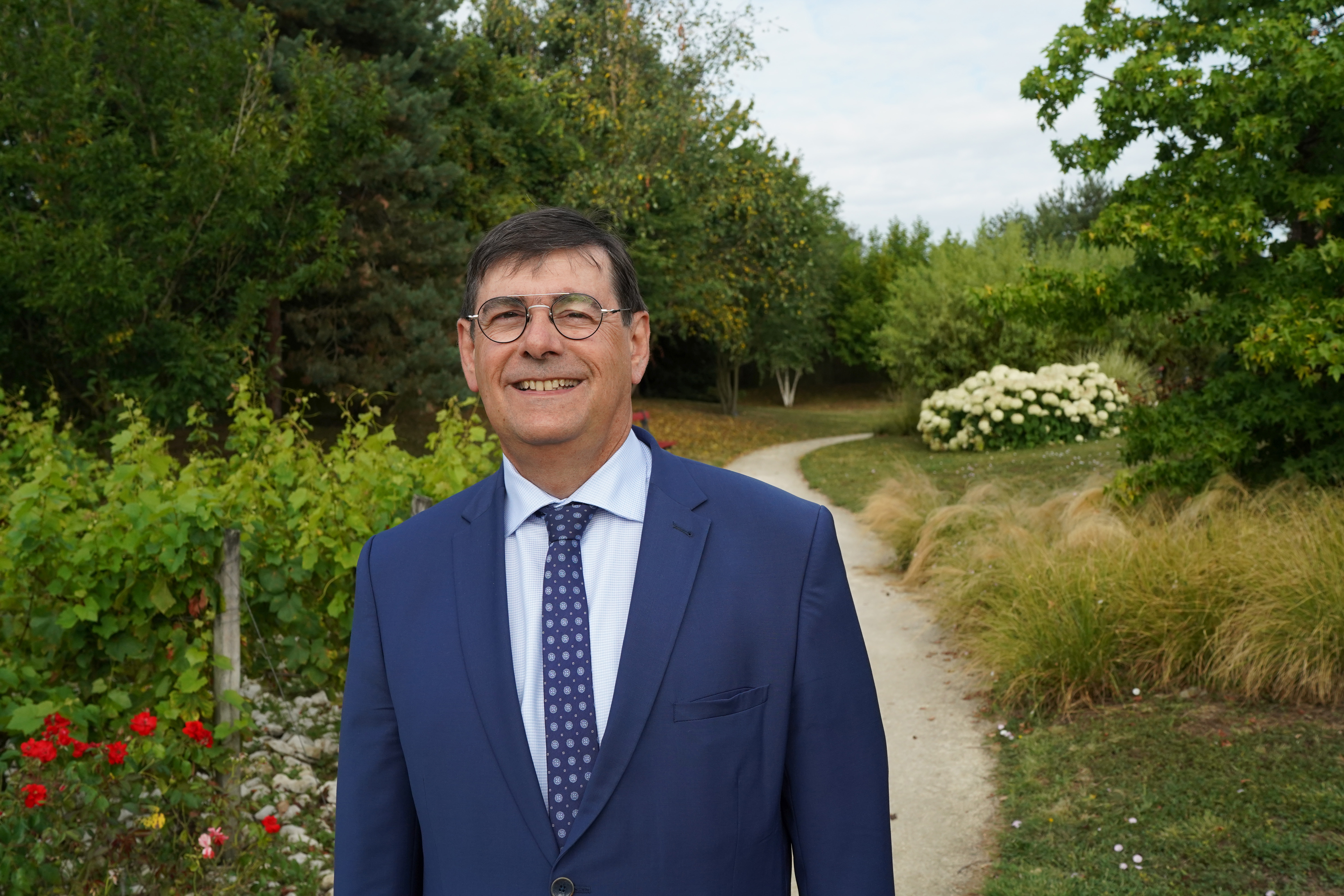

Member of the French Senate for Ain
- Incumbent
- Assumed office 1 October 2014
- Preceded by: Jacques Berthou

Personal details
- Born: 23 March 1963 (age 62); Saint-Symphorien-d'Ozon, France
- Political party: The Republicans

Patrick Chaize (born 23 March 1963) is a French Republican politician. He has been a member of the Senate representing the department of Ain since 2014.

He was re-elected in the 2020 French Senate election.
