= Miribel station =

Railway station in Miribel, France

Coordinates: 45°49′19″N 4°57′14″E

Miribel
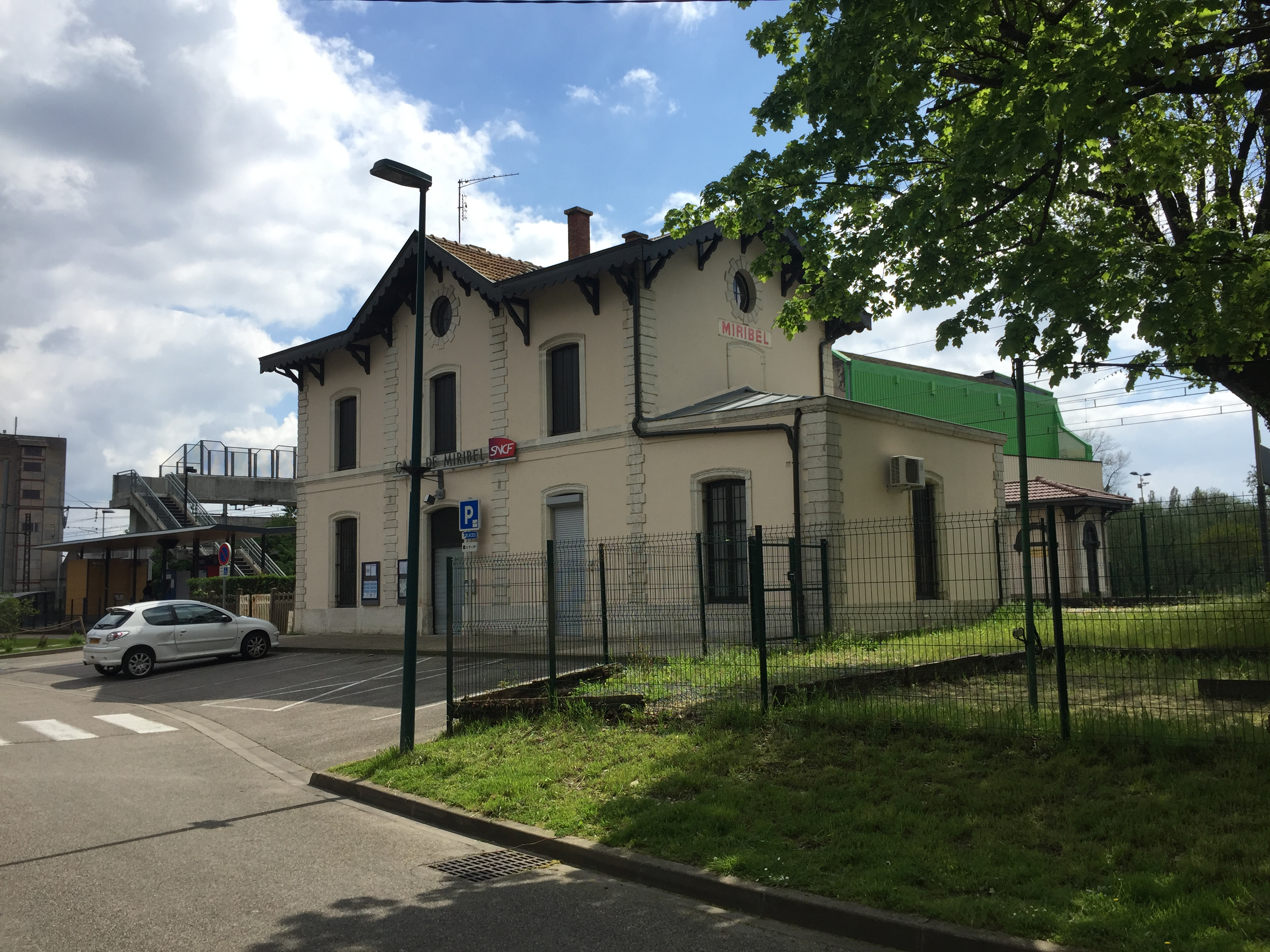
- Miribel station

General information
- Location: Place de la Gare; 01700 Miribel; Ain; France
- Elevation: 176 m
- Operated by: SNCF
- Managed by: SNCF
- Line: Lyon–Geneva railway
- Distance: 16.616 km
- Platforms: 2
- Tracks: 2

Other information
- Website: TER website

History
- Opened: 23 June 1856

Passengers
- 2019: 305,842

Services
Preceding station	TER Auvergne-Rhône-Alpes	Following station
Crépieux-la-Pape towards Lyon-Part-Dieu	35	Saint-Maurice-de-Beynost towards Chambéry
Location

Miribel (French pronunciation: [miʁibɛl]; French: Gare de Miribel) is a French railway station located in the commune of Miribel, Ain department in the Auvergne-Rhône-Alpes region. It is located at kilometric point (KP) 16.616 on the Lyon-Geneva railway, between Crépieux-la-Pape and Saint-Maurice-de-Beynost stations. Les Échets station is also located in the commune, in the Les Échets neighbourhood.

As of 2021, the station is owned and operated by the SNCF and served by TER Auvergne-Rhône-Alpes trains.

== History ==
The section of the Lyon–Geneva railway between Lyon and Ambérieu was opened on 23 June 1856.

In 2019, the SNCF estimated that 305,842 passengers traveled through the station.

== Services ==
=== Passenger services ===
Operated by the SNCF, the station still has an open passenger building with a passenger waiting room and automatic ticket machines.

=== Train services ===
As of 2021, the station is served by the following services:

- Regional services (TER Auvergne-Rhône-Alpes 35) Chambéry ... Culoz ... Ambérieu ... Lyon.

=== Intermodality ===
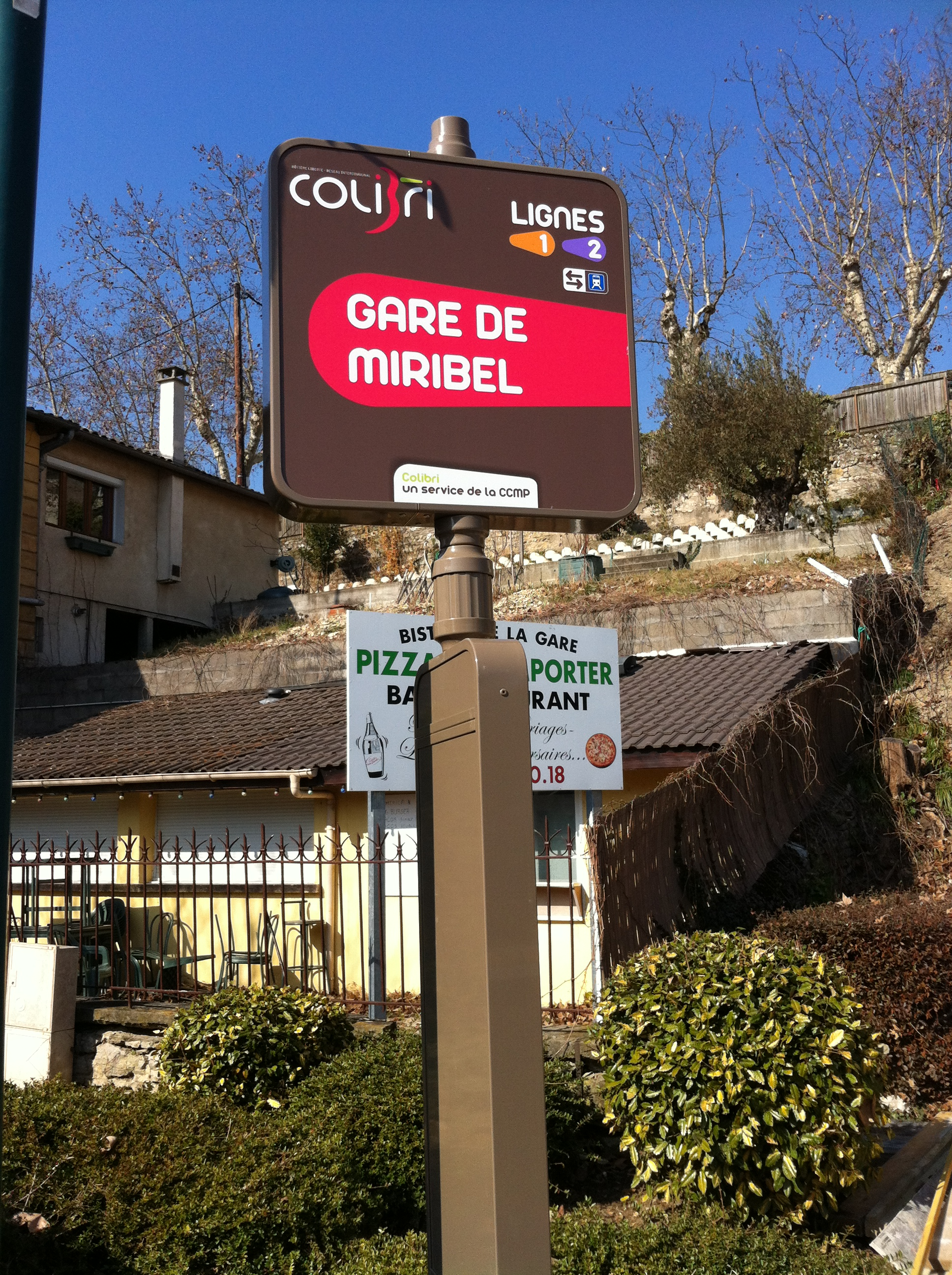
Miribel station (French: Gare de Miribel) bus stop.

In addition to a parking lot for passengers, the station is equipped with secure bicycle storage facilities. Since February 2012, lines 1 and 2 of the Côtière liberté réseau intercommunal (Colibri) network serve the station.

=== Freight services ===
Even though the station doesn't have any specialized tracks, the station is open to freight services.
