= Neyron =

Commune in Auvergne-Rhône-Alpes, France

- Commune
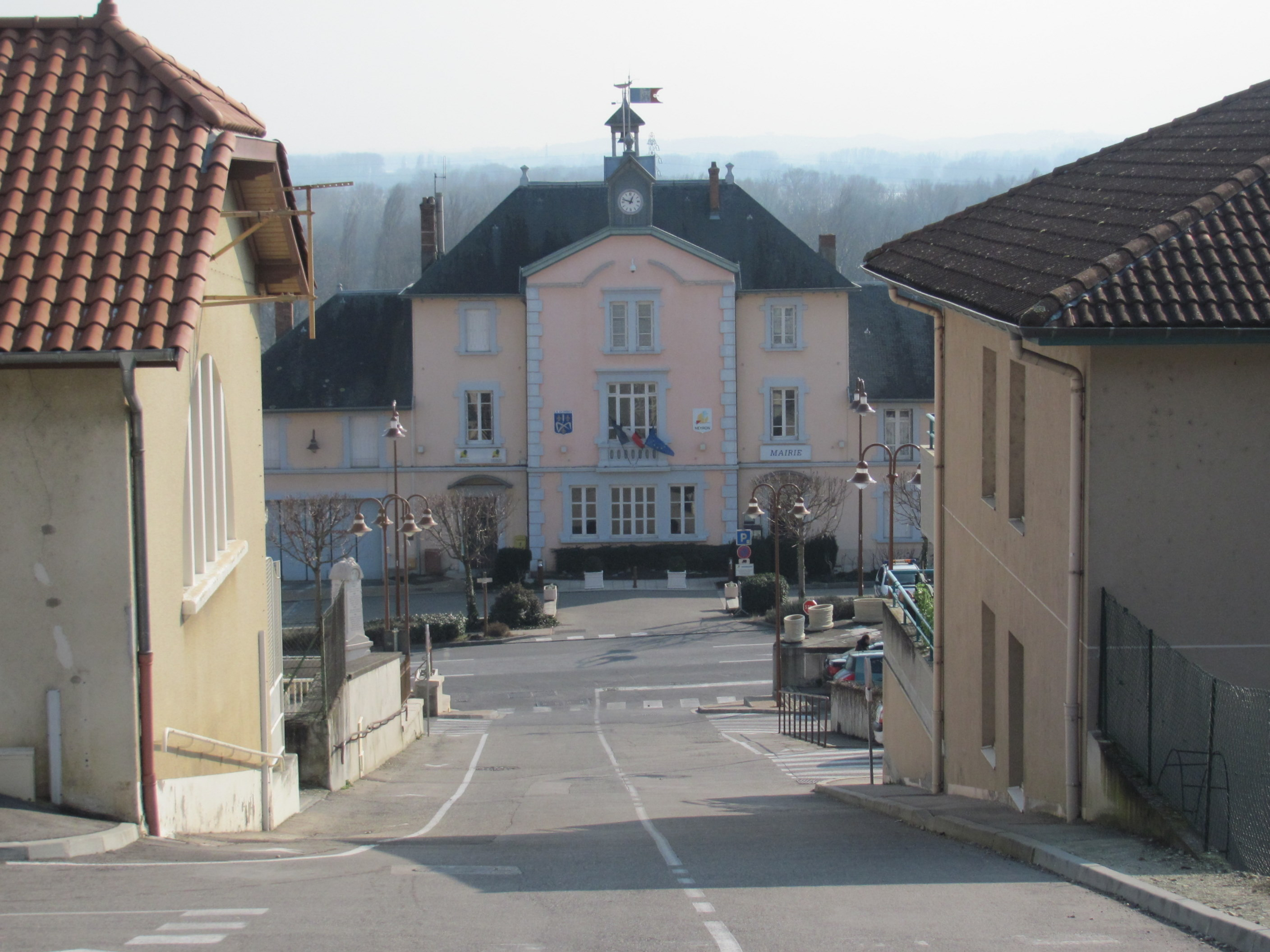
- Town hall
- Location of Neyron
- Location within France Location within Auvergne-Rhône-Alpes
- Coordinates: 45°48′49″N 4°55′50″E
- Country: France
- Region: Auvergne-Rhône-Alpes
- Department: Ain
- Arrondissement: Bourg-en-Bresse
- Canton: Miribel
- Intercommunality: CC Miribel et Plateau

Government
  - Mayor (2026–32): Christine Francois
- Area^{1}: 5.4 km^{2} (2.1 sq mi)
- Elevation: 190 m (620 ft)
- Highest elevation: 312 m (1,024 ft)
- Lowest elevation: 165 m (541 ft)
- Population (2023): 2,421
  - Density: 450/km^{2} (1,200/sq mi)
- Time zone: UTC+01:00 (CET)
  - Summer (DST): UTC+02:00 (CEST)
- INSEE/Postal code: 01275 /01700
- Website: https://www.neyron.fr/
- ^{1} French Land Register data, which excludes lakes, ponds, glaciers > 1 km^{2} (0.386 sq mi or 247 acres) and river estuaries.

Neyron (French pronunciation: [neʁɔ̃]) is a commune in the Ain department in eastern France.

== Population ==
Historical population

| Year | Pop. | ±% p.a. |
|---|---|---|
| 1793 | 426 | — |
| 1800 | 454 | +0.91% |
| 1806 | 533 | +2.71% |
| 1821 | 552 | +0.23% |
| 1831 | 584 | +0.57% |
| 1836 | 591 | +0.24% |
| 1841 | 565 | −0.90% |
| 1846 | 596 | +1.07% |
| 1851 | 537 | −2.06% |
| 1856 | 539 | +0.07% |
| 1861 | 556 | +0.62% |
| 1866 | 578 | +0.78% |
| 1872 | 575 | −0.09% |
| 1876 | 553 | −0.97% |
| 1881 | 568 | +0.54% |
| 1886 | 547 | −0.75% |
| 1891 | 545 | −0.07% |
| 1896 | 558 | +0.47% |
| 1901 | 586 | +0.98% |

| Year | Pop. | ±% p.a. |
|---|---|---|
| 1906 | 593 | +0.24% |
| 1911 | 534 | −2.07% |
| 1921 | 532 | −0.04% |
| 1926 | 576 | +1.60% |
| 1931 | 720 | +4.56% |
| 1936 | 640 | −2.33% |
| 1946 | 615 | −0.40% |
| 1954 | 802 | +3.37% |
| 1962 | 951 | +2.15% |
| 1968 | 1,032 | +1.37% |
| 1975 | 1,138 | +1.41% |
| 1982 | 1,326 | +2.21% |
| 1990 | 1,723 | +3.33% |
| 1999 | 2,157 | +2.53% |
| 2007 | 2,295 | +0.78% |
| 2012 | 2,506 | +1.77% |
| 2017 | 2,527 | +0.17% |
| 2023 | 2,421 | −0.71% |

Source: EHESS and INSEE (1968-2023)

== See also ==
- Communes of the Ain department
