= Niévroz =

Commune in Auvergne-Rhône-Alpes, France

Niévroz Lo Niévro (Arpitan)
- Commune
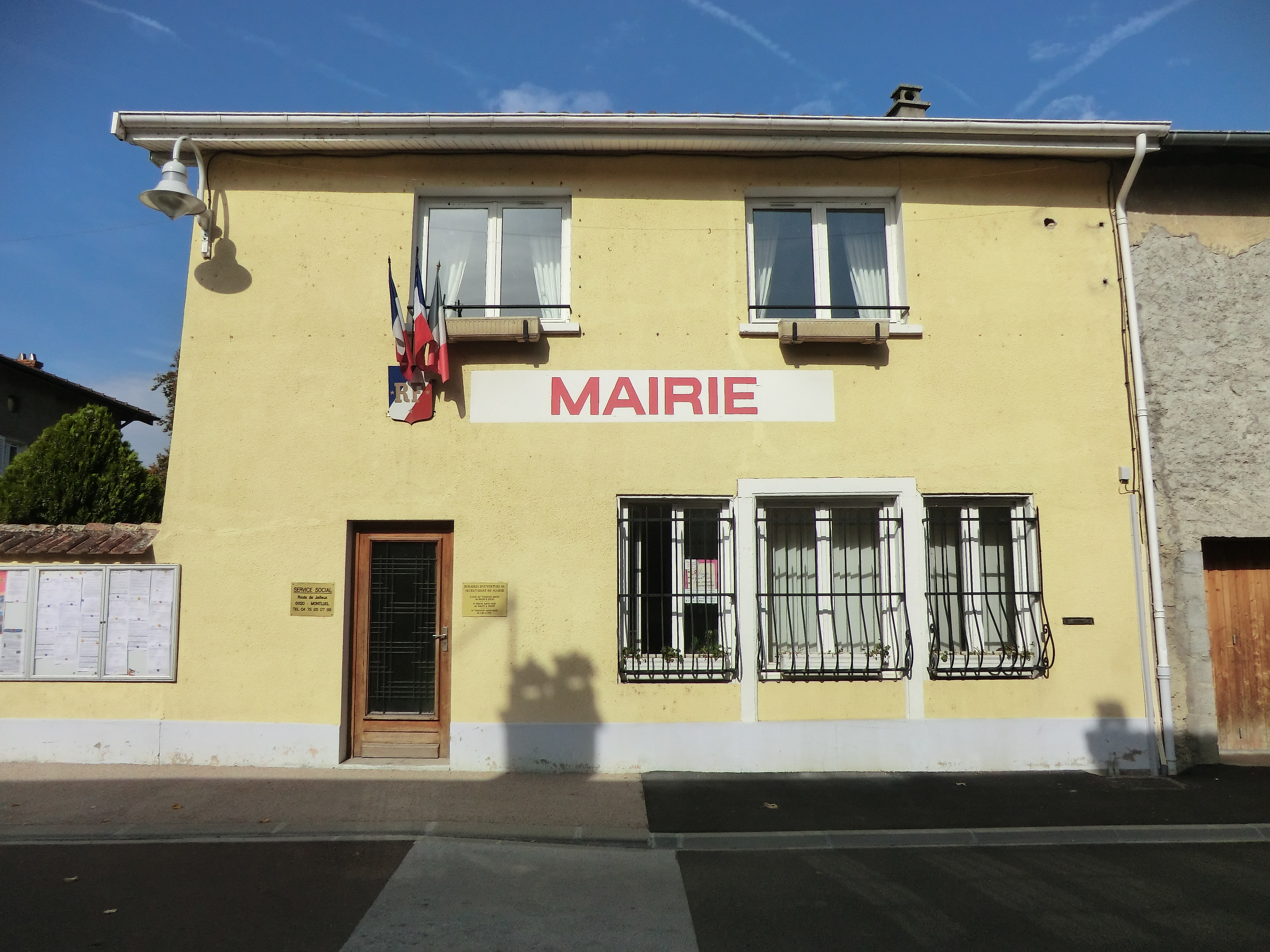
- Town hall

- Coat of arms
- Location of Niévroz
- Location within France Location within Auvergne-Rhône-Alpes
- Coordinates: 45°49′38″N 5°03′52″E
- Country: France
- Region: Auvergne-Rhône-Alpes
- Department: Ain
- Arrondissement: Bourg-en-Bresse
- Canton: Miribel
- Intercommunality: La Côtière à Montluel

Government
  - Mayor (2026–32): Jean-Christophe Détré
- Area^{1}: 10.46 km^{2} (4.04 sq mi)
- Elevation: 180 m (590 ft)
- Highest elevation: 197 m (646 ft)
- Lowest elevation: 175 m (574 ft)
- Population (2023): 1,662
  - Density: 158.9/km^{2} (411.5/sq mi)
- Time zone: UTC+01:00 (CET)
  - Summer (DST): UTC+02:00 (CEST)
- INSEE/Postal code: 01276 /01120
- ^{1} French Land Register data, which excludes lakes, ponds, glaciers > 1 km^{2} (0.386 sq mi or 247 acres) and river estuaries.

Niévroz (French pronunciation: [njevʁo]; Arpitan: Lo Niévro [lɔ ˈniː.vrɔ]) is a commune in the Ain department in eastern France.

== Population ==
The inhabitants are known as Nièvrants in French.

Historical population
Year	Pop.	±% p.a.
1968	502	—
1975	627	+3.23%
1982	782	+3.21%
1990	1,061	+3.89%
1999	1,360	+2.80%
2007	1,499	+1.22%
2012	1,502	+0.04%
2017	1,619	+1.51%
2023	1,662	+0.44%
Source: INSEE

== See also ==
- Communes of the Ain department
