= Thil, Ain =

Commune in Auvergne-Rhône-Alpes, France

Thil
- Commune
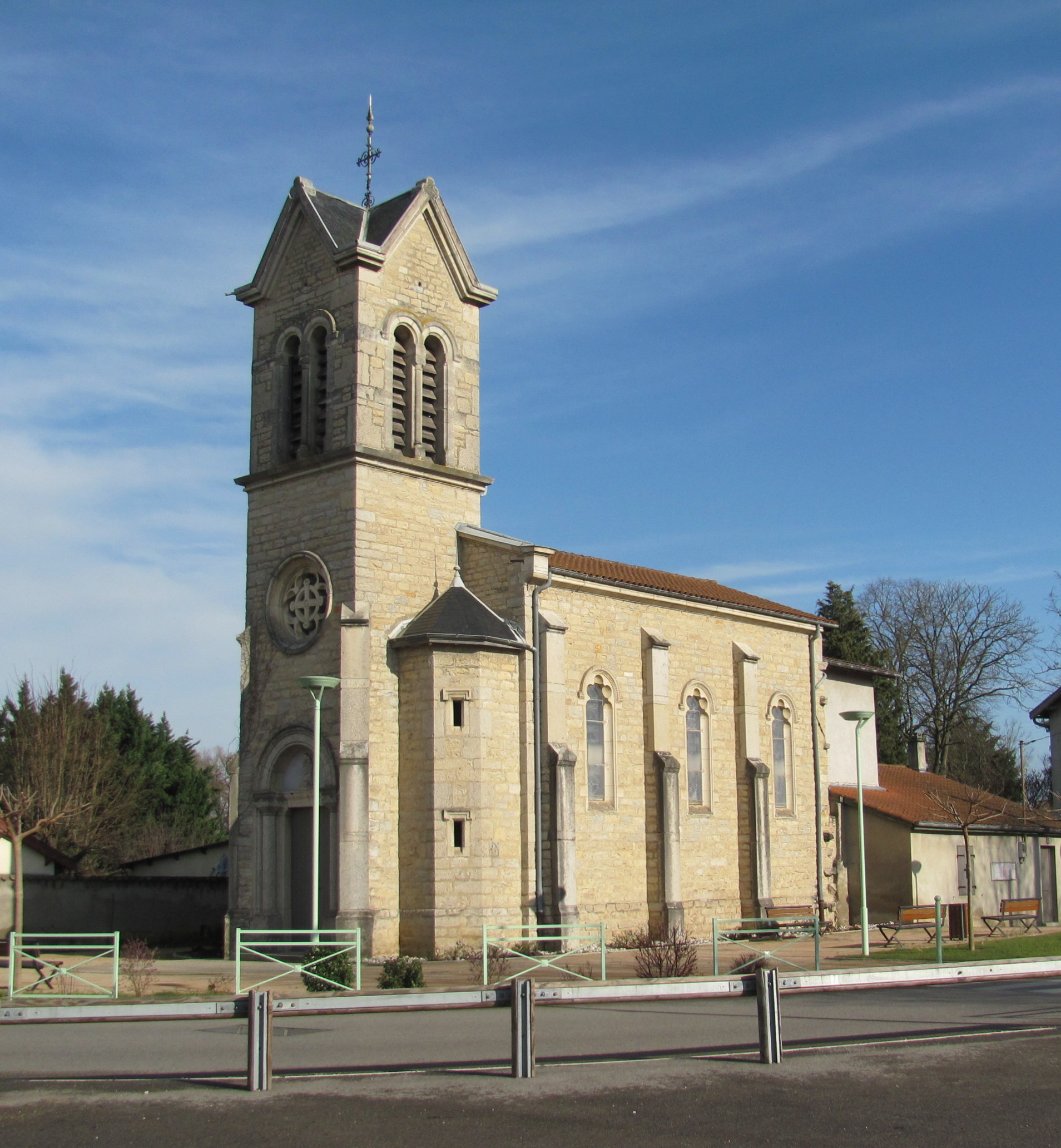
- Location of Thil
- Location within France Location within Auvergne-Rhône-Alpes
- Coordinates: 45°49′00″N 5°01′00″E
- Country: France
- Region: Auvergne-Rhône-Alpes
- Department: Ain
- Arrondissement: Bourg-en-Bresse
- Canton: Miribel
- Intercommunality: Miribel et Plateau

Government
  - Mayor (2026–32): Valérie Pommaz
- Area^{1}: 5.2 km^{2} (2.0 sq mi)
- Elevation: 178 m (584 ft)
- Highest elevation: 183 m (600 ft)
- Lowest elevation: 174 m (571 ft)
- Population (2023): 1,261
  - Density: 240/km^{2} (630/sq mi)
- Time zone: UTC+01:00 (CET)
  - Summer (DST): UTC+02:00 (CEST)
- INSEE/Postal code: 01418 /01120
- Website: https://www.thil.fr/
- ^{1} French Land Register data, which excludes lakes, ponds, glaciers > 1 km^{2} (0.386 sq mi or 247 acres) and river estuaries.

Thil (French pronunciation: [til]) is a commune in the Ain department in eastern France.

== Population ==
Historical population
Year	Pop.	±% p.a.
1968	364	—
1975	480	+4.03%
1982	588	+2.94%
1990	769	+3.41%
1999	949	+2.36%
2007	1,079	+1.62%
2012	1,030	−0.93%
2017	1,088	+1.10%
2023	1,261	+2.49%
Source: INSEE

== See also ==
- Communes of the Ain department
