= Canton of Miribel =

Coordinates: 45°49′33″N 4°57′16″E

Miribel
- Canton
- Interactive map of Miribel
- Country: France
- Region: Auvergne-Rhône-Alpes
- Department: Ain
- No. of communes: {{{nbcomm}}}
- Area: 85.42 km^{2} (32.98 sq mi)
- Population (2023): 30,570
  - Density: 357.9/km^{2} (926.9/sq mi)
- INSEE code: 01 13

The canton of Miribel is an administrative division in eastern France. At the French canton reorganisation which came into effect in March 2015, the canton was expanded from 5 to 8 communes:

1. Beynost
2. La Boisse
3. Miribel
4. Neyron
5. Niévroz
6. Saint-Maurice-de-Beynost
7. Thil
8. Tramoyes

== Demographics ==
Historical population
Year	Pop.	±% p.a.
2013	27,340	—
2018	28,916	+1.13%
Source: INSEE

== See also ==
- Cantons of the Ain department
- Communes of France
