= Communauté de communes de Miribel et du Plateau =

Federation of municipalities in France

Coordinates: 45.83°N 4.95°E

- Communauté de communes
- Location within the Ain department on 1 January 2017
- Country: France
- Region: Auvergne-Rhône-Alpes
- Department: Ain
- No. of communes: {{{nbcomm}}}
- Established: 31 December 1997

Government
  - President (2020–2026): Caroline Terrier (LR)
- Area: 65.56 km^{2} (25.31 sq mi)
- Population (2018): 24,062
  - Density: 367.0/km^{2} (950.6/sq mi)
- Website: www.cc-miribel.fr

The Communauté de communes de Miribel et du Plateau is a communauté de communes in the Ain département and in the Auvergne-Rhône-Alpes région of France. It was established on 31 December 1997. Its area is 65.6 km^{2}, and its population was 24,062 in 2018.

== Composition ==
This Communauté de communes includes the following 6 communes:

List of communes in the Communauté de communes de Miribel et du Plateau
Commune	Code INSEE	Demonym	Area (km^{2})	Population (2018)	Density (per km^{2})
Miribel (seat)	01249	Miribellans	24.49	10,043	410
Beynost	01043	Beynolans	10.64	4,684	440
Neyron	01275	Neyrolands	5.36	2,549	476
Saint-Maurice-de-Beynost	01376	Mauriciens	6.99	3,977	569
Thil	01418	Thilois	5.15	1,081	210
Tramoyes	01424	Tramoyens	12.93	1,728	134

== Administration ==
=== President ===
List of successive presidents of the Communauté de communes de Miribel et du Plateau
In office		Name	Party	Capacity	Ref.
1997	2001	Odette Mader		Mayor of Saint-Maurice-de-Beynost	
April 2001	14 April 2008	Michel Matras			
14 April 2008	2020	Pascal Protière		Municipal councillor for Miribel	
2020	Incumbent	Caroline Terrier	LR	Mayor of Beynost Departmental councillor for the Ain	

== See also ==
- Communes of the Ain department
