= Beynost =

Commune in Auvergne-Rhône-Alpes, France

- Commune
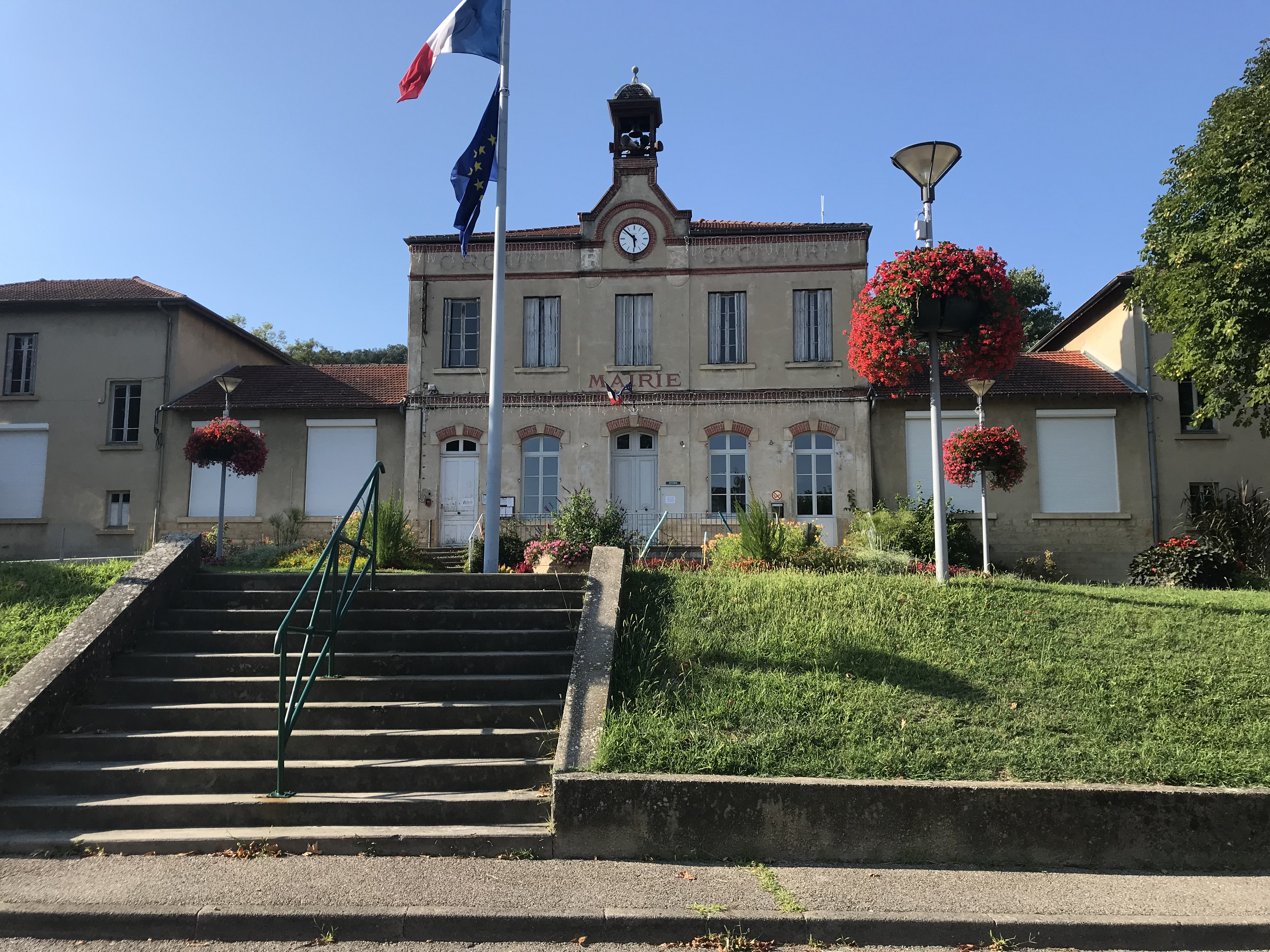
- Town hall

- Coat of arms
- Location of Beynost
- Location within France Location within Auvergne-Rhône-Alpes
- Coordinates: 45°50′28″N 5°00′07″E
- Country: France
- Region: Auvergne-Rhône-Alpes
- Department: Ain
- Arrondissement: Bourg-en-Bresse
- Canton: Miribel
- Intercommunality: Miribel et Plateau

Government
  - Mayor (2026–32): Caroline Terrier
- Area^{1}: 10.64 km^{2} (4.11 sq mi)
- Elevation: 150 m (490 ft)
- Highest elevation: 322 m (1,056 ft)
- Lowest elevation: 174 m (571 ft)
- Population (2023): 5,198
  - Density: 488.5/km^{2} (1,265/sq mi)
- Time zone: UTC+01:00 (CET)
  - Summer (DST): UTC+02:00 (CEST)
- INSEE/Postal code: 01043 /01700
- Website: https://www.beynost.fr/
- ^{1} French Land Register data, which excludes lakes, ponds, glaciers > 1 km^{2} (0.386 sq mi or 247 acres) and river estuaries.

Beynost (French pronunciation: [beno]) is a commune in the Ain department, Auvergne-Rhône-Alpes region in eastern France. The commune is approximately 15 km from Lyon, and part of the unité urbaine de Lyon. Historically, Beynost is also part of the naturally forming region of Côtière. Beynost station has rail connections to Lyon, Ambérieu-en-Bugey and Chambéry.

== Politics and administration ==
=== List of mayors ===
List of successive Mayors of Beynost since 1945
In office		Name	Party	Capacity	Ref.
1945	1965	Henry Gabrielle		Doctor	
1965	1969	Lucien Breton			
1969	1981	André Enjolras	Mvt.réf.		
1981	1983	Michel Derain			
1983	1985	Jean Lamy			
1985	1995	Yves Voisin			
1995	2008	Claude-Jean Garnier	DVD		
2008	2016	Michel Nicod	DVD		
2016	Incumbent	Caroline Terrier	LR		

== Population ==
Historical population
Year	Pop.	±% p.a.
1968	1,763	—
1975	2,311	+3.94%
1982	2,714	+2.32%
1990	3,141	+1.84%
1999	3,530	+1.31%
2007	4,240	+2.32%
2012	4,528	+1.32%
2017	4,613	+0.37%
2023	5,198	+2.01%
Source: INSEE

== See also ==
- Communes of the Ain department
