= Miribel, Ain =

Commune in Auvergne-Rhône-Alpes, France

Miribel
- Commune
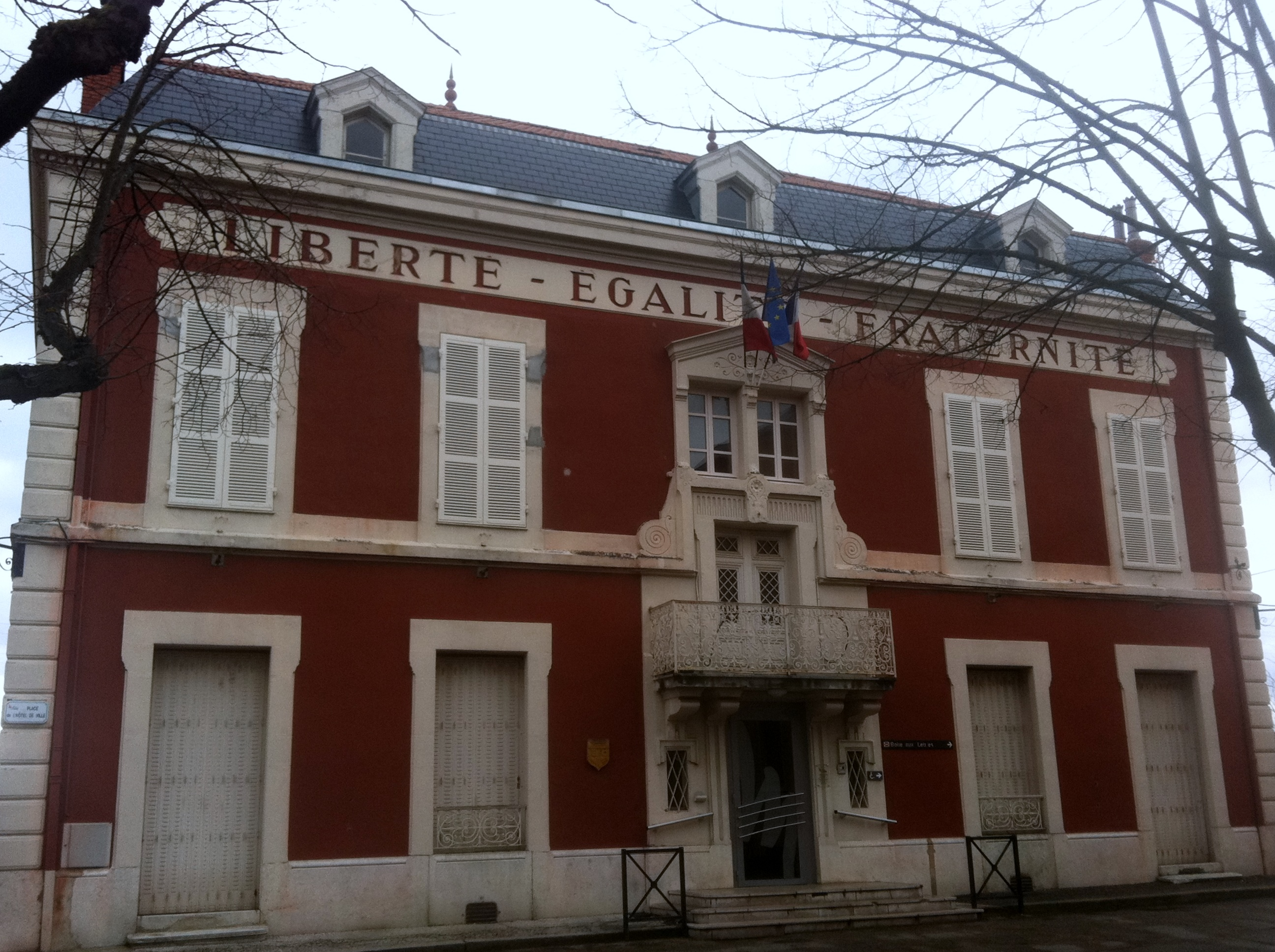
- Town hall

- Coat of arms
- Location of Miribel
- Location within France Location within Auvergne-Rhône-Alpes
- Coordinates: 45°49′31″N 4°57′13″E
- Country: France
- Region: Auvergne-Rhône-Alpes
- Department: Ain
- Arrondissement: Bourg-en-Bresse
- Canton: Miribel
- Intercommunality: CC Miribel et Plateau

Government
  - Mayor (2026–32): Sylvie Viricel
- Area^{1}: 24.49 km^{2} (9.46 sq mi)
- Elevation: 174 m (571 ft)
- Highest elevation: 314 m (1,030 ft)
- Lowest elevation: 168 m (551 ft)
- Population (2023): 10,395
  - Density: 424.5/km^{2} (1,099/sq mi)
- Time zone: UTC+01:00 (CET)
  - Summer (DST): UTC+02:00 (CEST)
- INSEE/Postal code: 01249 /01700
- ^{1} French Land Register data, which excludes lakes, ponds, glaciers > 1 km^{2} (0.386 sq mi or 247 acres) and river estuaries.

Miribel (French pronunciation: [miʁibɛl]) is a commune in the Ain department in eastern France.

It is a northeastern suburb of Lyon. There are two railway stations in the commune: Miribel station for trains to Lyon, Ambérieu and Chambéry, and Les Échets station for trains to Lyon and Bourg-en-Bresse.

== Toponymy ==
The name Miribel possibly derives from the Latin mirare bellum, meaning 'beautiful view'.

== Population ==
Historical population

Year	Pop.	±% p.a.
1793	1,975	—
1800	2,650	+4.29%
1806	2,555	−0.61%
1821	3,049	+1.19%
1831	2,400	−2.37%
1836	2,321	−0.67%
1841	2,636	+2.58%
1846	2,829	+1.42%
1851	2,913	+0.59%
1856	3,026	+0.76%
1861	3,139	+0.74%
1866	3,360	+1.37%
1872	3,205	−0.78%
1876	3,480	+2.08%
1881	3,076	−2.44%
1886	3,262	+1.18%
1891	3,420	+0.95%
1896	3,339	−0.48%
1901	3,406	+0.40%

Year	Pop.	±% p.a.
1906	3,370	−0.21%
1911	3,379	+0.05%
1921	3,114	−0.81%
1926	3,437	+1.99%
1931	4,068	+3.43%
1936	4,330	+1.26%
1946	3,807	−1.28%
1954	4,248	+1.38%
1962	4,580	+0.95%
1968	5,651	+3.56%
1975	6,237	+1.42%
1982	7,053	+1.77%
1990	7,683	+1.08%
1999	8,539	+1.18%
2007	8,963	+0.61%
2012	9,128	+0.37%
2017	9,963	+1.77%
2023	10,395	+0.71%

Source: EHESS and INSEE (1968-2023)

== See also ==
- Communes of the Ain department
