= Isère =

Department in Auvergne-Rhône-Alpes, France

Isère Isera (Arpitan) Isèra (Occitan)
- Department
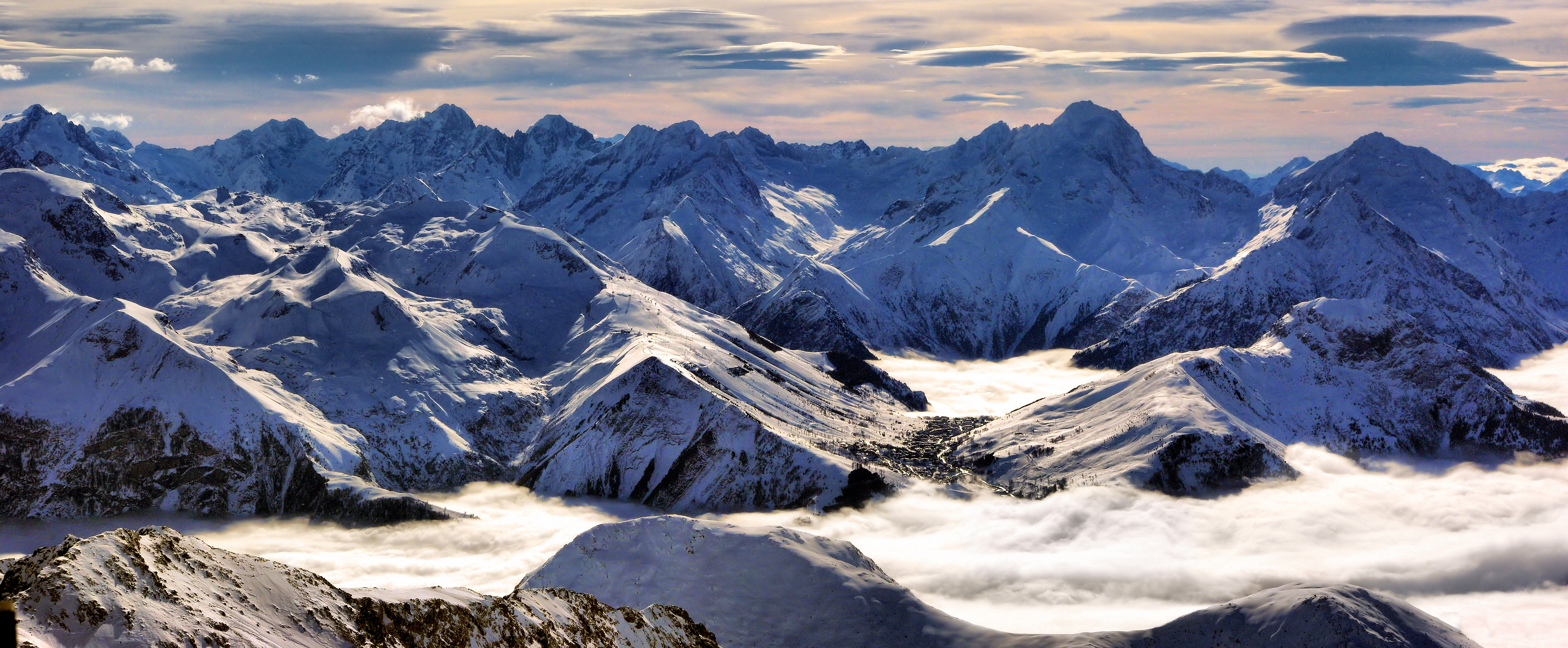
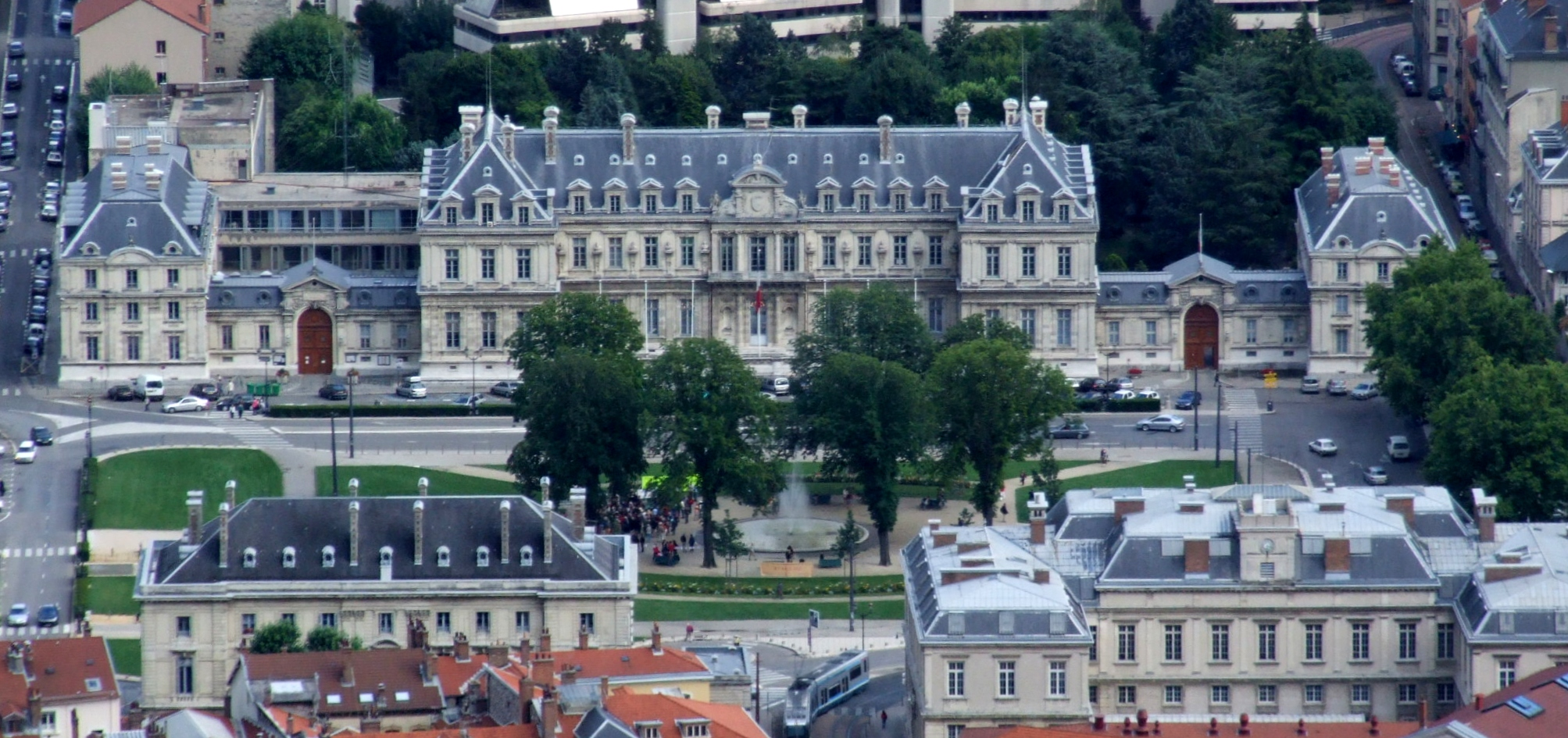
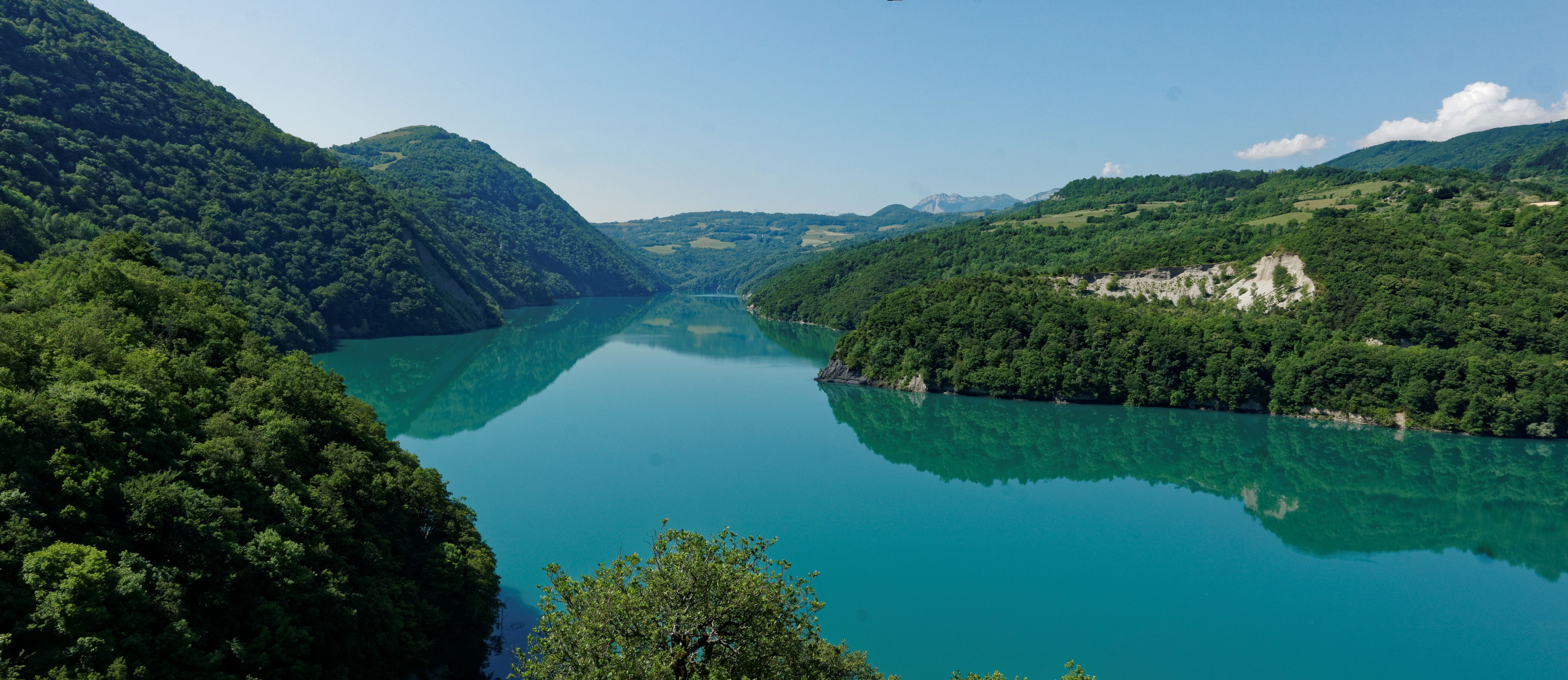
- Top down: Les Deux Alpes ski resort, prefecture building in Grenoble, Notre-Dame-de-Commiers

- Flag Coat of arms

- Location of Isère in France
- Coordinates: 45°20′N 05°30′E
- Country: France
- Region: Auvergne-Rhône-Alpes
- Prefecture: Grenoble
- Subprefectures: La Tour-du-Pin; Vienne

Government
  - President of the Departmental Council: Jean-Pierre Barbier (LR)

Area^{1}
  - Total: 7,431 km^{2} (2,869 sq mi)
- Elevation: 846 m (2,776 ft)
- Highest elevation: 4,088 m (13,412 ft)
- Lowest elevation: 134 m (440 ft)

Population (2023)
  - Total: 1,298,990
  - Rank: 15th
  - Density: 174.8/km^{2} (452.7/sq mi)
- Time zone: UTC+1 (CET)
  - Summer (DST): UTC+2 (CEST)
- Department number: 38
- Arrondissements: 3
- Cantons: 29
- Communes: 512
- ^1 French Land Register data, which exclude estuaries and lakes, ponds and glaciers larger than 1 km^{2}

Isère (US: /iːˈzɛər/ ee-ZAIR; French: [izɛʁ]; Arpitan: Isera; Occitan: Isèra, Occitan pronunciation: [iˈsɛɾa]) is a landlocked department in the southeastern French region of Auvergne-Rhône-Alpes. Named after the river Isère, it had a population of 1,298,990 in 2023. Its prefecture is Grenoble. It borders Rhône to the northwest, Ain to the north, Savoie to the east, Hautes-Alpes to the south, Drôme and Ardèche to the southwest and Loire to the west.

== History ==
Isère is one of the original 83 departments created during the French Revolution on 4 March 1790. It was established from the main part of the former province of Dauphiné. Its area was reduced twice, in 1852 and again in 1967, on both occasions losing territory to the department of Rhône.

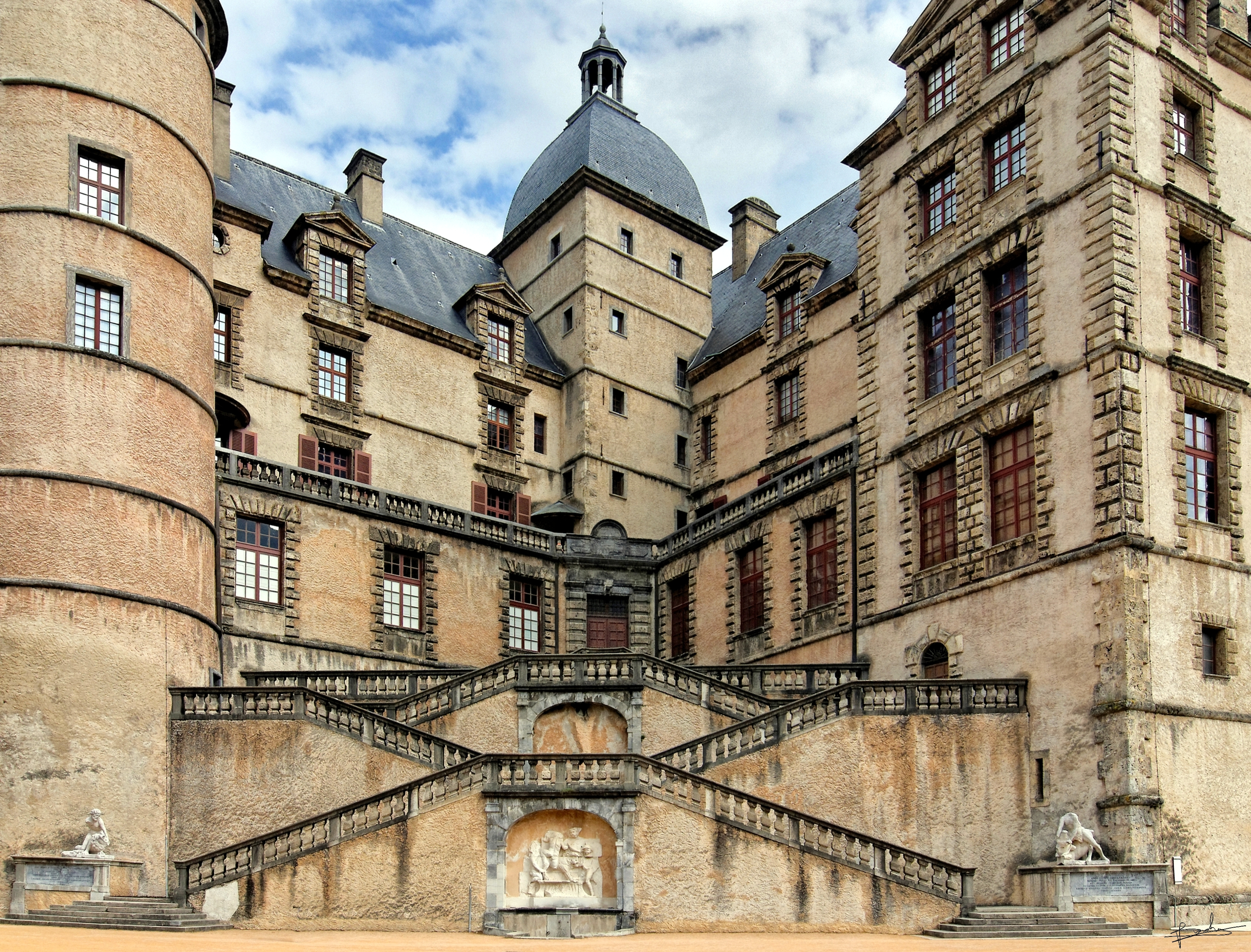
The Château de Vizille, which was the seat of the Assembly of Vizille that followed the 1788 Day of the Tiles in Grenoble, now houses the Musée de la Révolution française.

In 1852 in response to rapid urban development around the edge of Lyon, the (hitherto Isère) communes of Bron, Vaulx-en-Velin, Vénissieux and Villeurbanne were transferred to Rhône. In 1967 the redrawing of local government borders led to the creation of the Urban Community of Lyon (more recently known simply as Greater Lyon or Grand Lyon). At that time intercommunal groupings of this nature were not permitted to straddle departmental frontiers, and accordingly 23 more Isère communes (along with six communes from Ain) found themselves transferred to Rhône. The affected Isère communes were Chaponnay, Chassieu, Communay, Corbas, Décines-Charpieu, Feyzin, Genas, Jonage, Jons, Marennes, Meyzieu, Mions, Pusignan, Saint-Bonnet-de-Mure, Saint-Laurent-de-Mure, Saint-Pierre-de-Chandieu, Saint-Priest, Saint-Symphorien-d'Ozon, Sérézin-du-Rhône, Simandres, Solaize, Ternay and Toussieu.

Most recently, on 1 April 1971, Colombier-Saugnieu was transferred to Rhône. Banners appeared in the commune's three little villages at the time proclaiming Dauphinois toujours ("Always Dauphinois").

== Geography ==
Isère includes a part of the French Alps. The highest point in the department is the subpeak Pic Lory at 4,088 metres (13,412 feet), subsidiary to the 4,102 metres (13,458 feet) Barre des Écrins in the adjoining Hautes-Alpes department. The summit of La Meije at 3,988 metres (13,084 feet) is also well known. The Vercors Plateau aesthetically dominates the western part of the department.

=== Principal towns ===
The most populous commune is Grenoble, the prefecture. As of 2023, there were 7 communes with more than 20,000 inhabitants:

Commune	Population (2023)
Grenoble	156,140
Saint-Martin-d'Hères	37,695
Échirolles	37,491
Vienne	31,778
Bourgoin-Jallieu	30,151
Fontaine	22,020
Voiron	21,847

== Demographics ==
Inhabitants of the department are called Isérois (masculine) and Iséroises (feminine) in French.

Population development since 1801:

Historical population

Year	Pop.	±% p.a.
1801	435,888	—
1806	471,660	+1.59%
1831	550,258	+0.62%
1841	588,660	+0.68%
1851	603,497	+0.25%
1861	577,748	−0.44%
1872	575,784	−0.03%
1881	580,271	+0.09%
1891	572,145	−0.14%
1901	568,693	−0.06%
1911	555,911	−0.23%
1921	525,522	−0.56%
1931	584,017	+1.06%

Year	Pop.	±% p.a.
1936	572,742	−0.39%
1946	574,019	+0.02%
1954	626,116	+1.09%
1962	729,789	+1.93%
1968	767,678	+0.85%
1975	860,339	+1.64%
1982	936,771	+1.22%
1990	1,016,228	+1.02%
1999	1,094,006	+0.82%
2007	1,178,714	+0.94%
2012	1,224,993	+0.77%
2017	1,258,722	+0.54%
2023	1,298,990	+0.53%

== Politics ==
=== Departmental politics ===
The President of the Departmental Council has been Jean-Pierre Barbier of The Republicans (LR) since 2015.

Following the 2021 departmental election, the Departmental Council of Isère (58 seats) was composed as follows:

Group		Seats
•	The Republicans and allies	26
	Socialist Party and allies	13
•	Union of Democrats and Independents and allies	5
	French Communist Party and allies	5
	Europe Ecology – The Greens and allies	4
•	Independents	3
•	La République En Marche!	2

=== Representation in Paris ===
==== National Assembly ====
In the 2024 legislative election, Isère elected the following representatives to the National Assembly:

Constituency	Member	Party
Isère's 1st constituency	Hugo Prevost	La France Insoumise
Isère's 2nd constituency	Cyrielle Chatelain	The Ecologists
Isère's 3rd constituency	Élisa Martin	La France Insoumise
Isère's 4th constituency	Marie-Noëlle Battistel	Socialist Party
Isère's 5th constituency	Jérémie Iordanoff	The Ecologists
Isère's 6th constituency	Alexis Jolly	National Rally
Isère's 7th constituency	Yannick Neuder	The Republicans
Isère's 8th constituency	Hanane Mansouri	UDR
Isère's 9th constituency	Sandrine Nosbé	La France Insoumise
Isère's 10th constituency	Thierry Perez	National Rally

In 2024, all the Renaissance and Democratic Movement candidates lost their seats: to La France Insoumise in the 1st and 9th constituencies, and to RN-coalition parties in the 8th and 10th. The other representatives were all reelected.

==== Senate ====
In the 2017 Senate election, Isère elected Didier Rambaud (La République En Marche!), Guillaume Gontard (miscellaneous left), Frédérique Puissat (The Republicans), Michel Savin (The Republicans) and André Vallini (Socialist Party) for the 2017–2023 term.

== Transport ==
The department is served by Alpes–Isère Airport which provides flights to some European destinations. However, other airports such as Lyon–Saint-Exupéry Airport and Geneva Airport are also used by air travellers from the department as both airports provide more domestic and international destinations.

== Culture ==
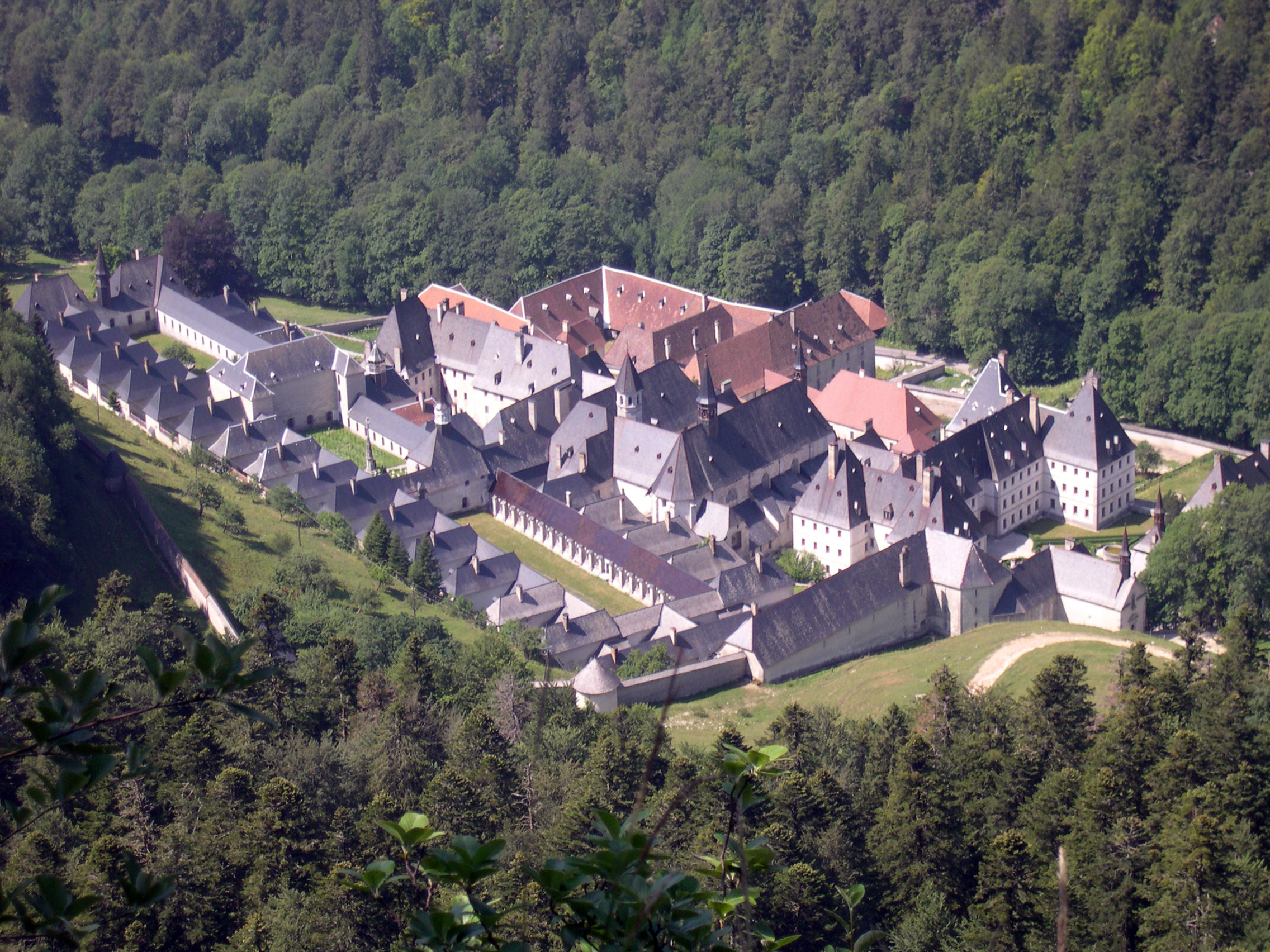
The Grande Chartreuse

The Grande Chartreuse is the mother abbey of the Carthusian order. It is located 22 km (14 mi) north of Grenoble.

As early as the 13th century, residents of the north and central parts of Isère spoke a dialect of the Franco-Provençal language called Dauphinois, while those in the Southern parts spoke the Vivaro-Alpine dialect of Occitan. Both continued to be spoken in rural areas of Isère into the 20th century.

== Tourism ==
Isère features many ski resorts, including the Alpe d'Huez, Les Deux Alpes, the 1968 Winter Olympics resorts of Chamrousse, Villard de Lans, Autrans. Other popular resorts include Les 7 Laux, Méaudre, Saint-Pierre-de-Chartreuse, Alpe du Grand Serre and Gresse-en-Vercors. At the department level, Isère is the third-largest ski and winter destination in France, after Savoie and Haute-Savoie. It also hosts Coupe Icare, an annual festival of free flight, such as paragliding and hang-gliding, held at the world-renowned paragliding site at Lumbin.

Grenoble has a dozen museums, including its most famous, established in 1798, the Museum of Grenoble. The European Synchrotron Radiation Facility (ESRF), an international research facility in Grenoble, is also open to visitors.

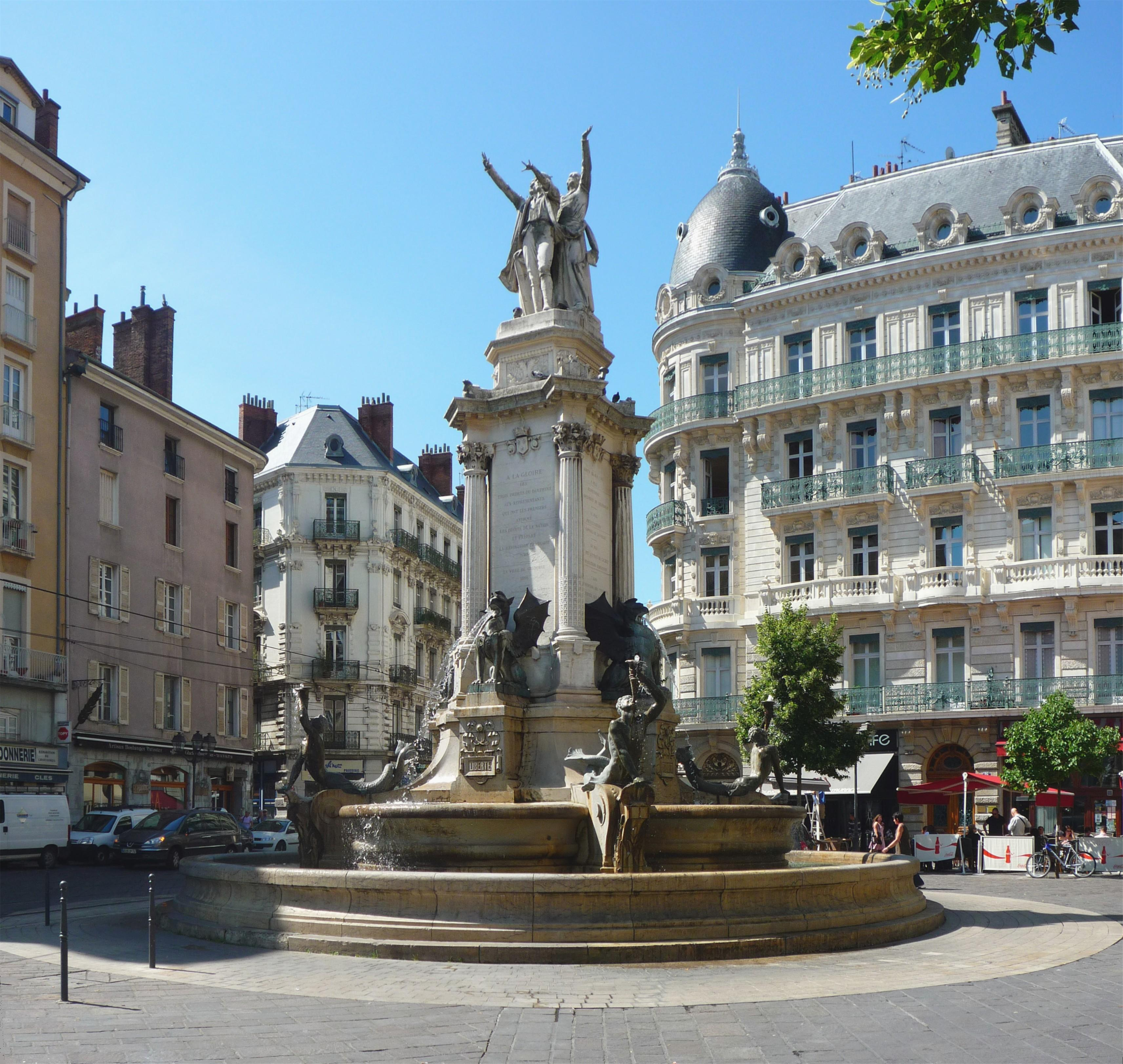
Grenoble

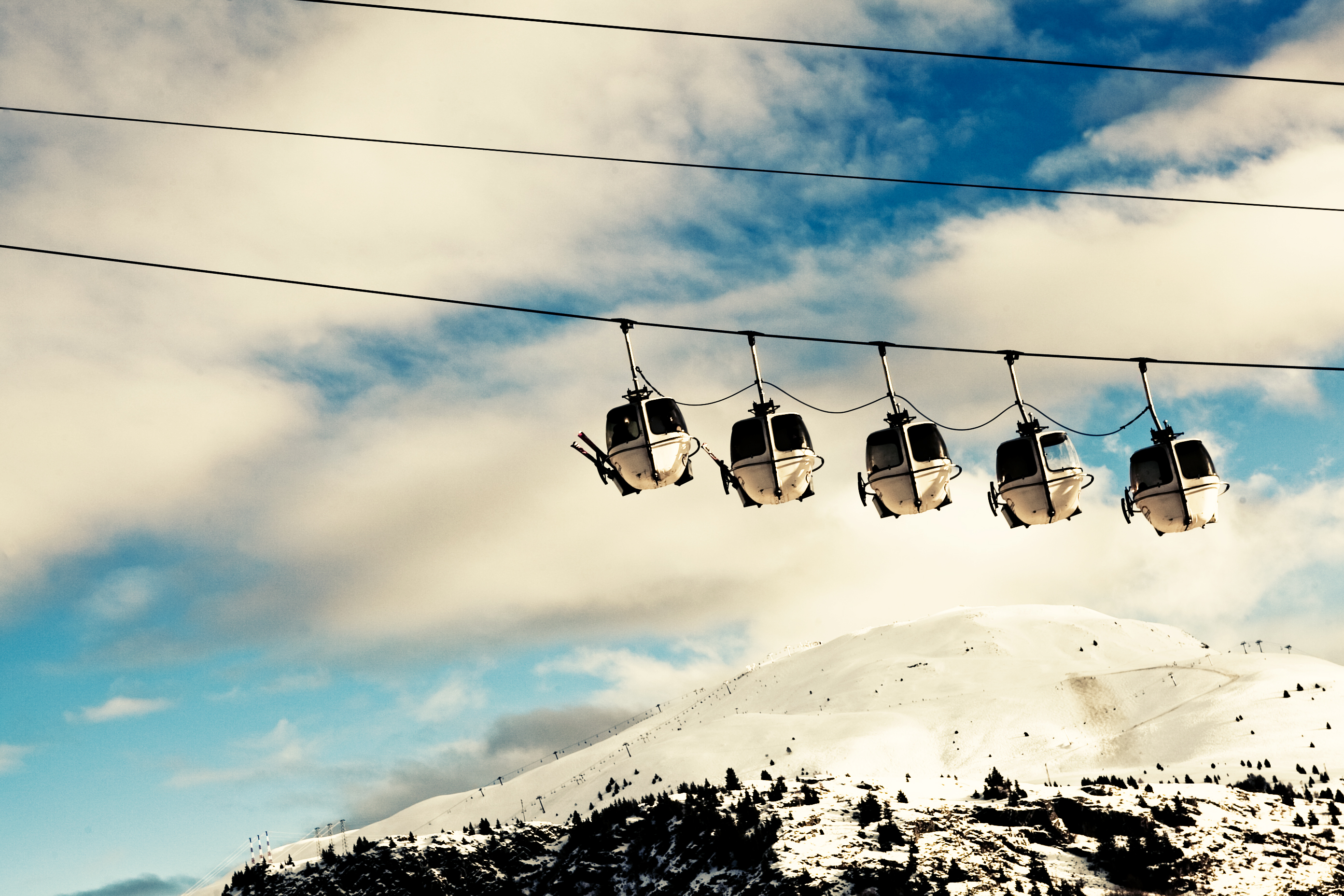
Ski lift at Alpe d'Huez

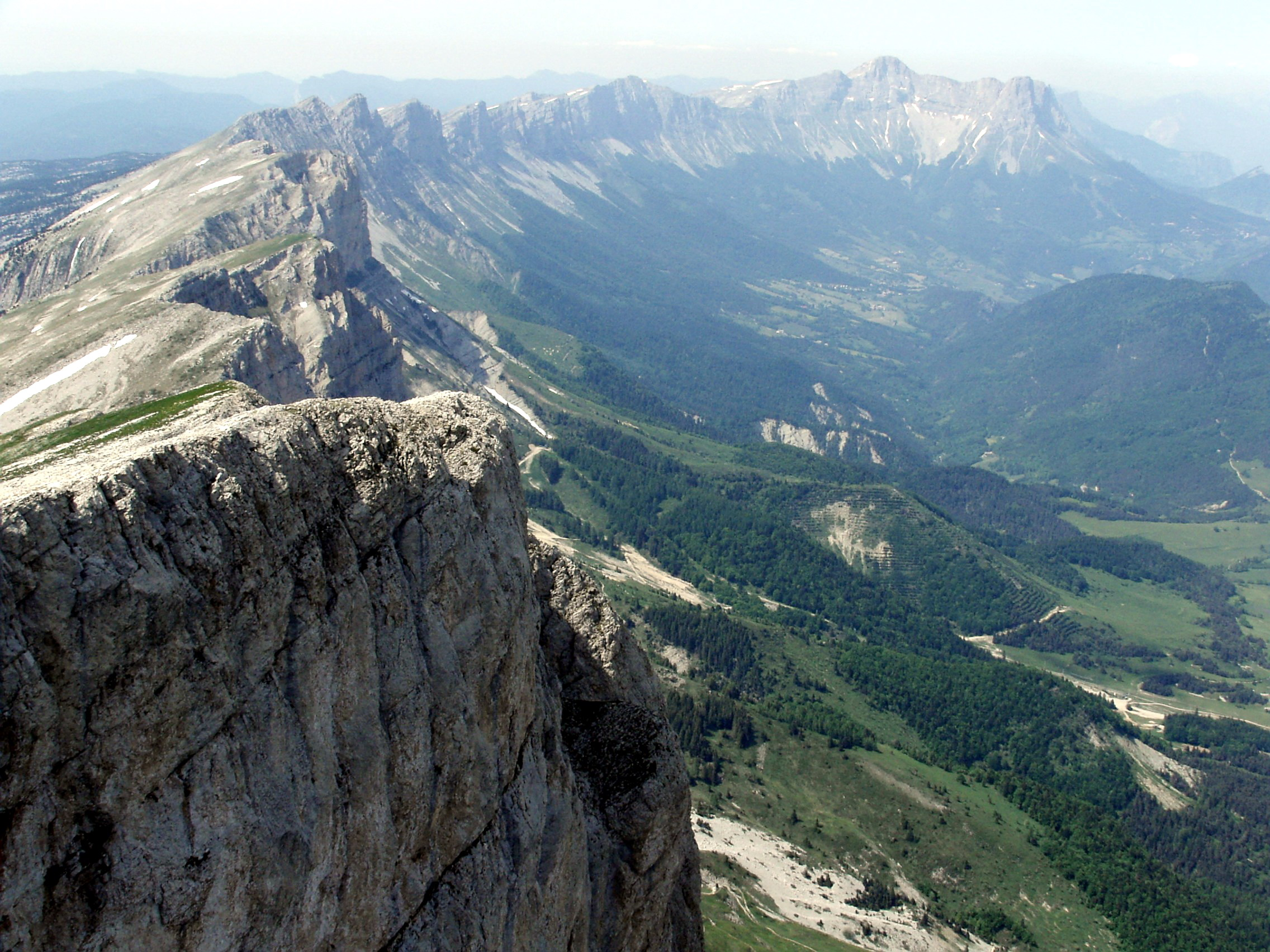
The Grand Veymont

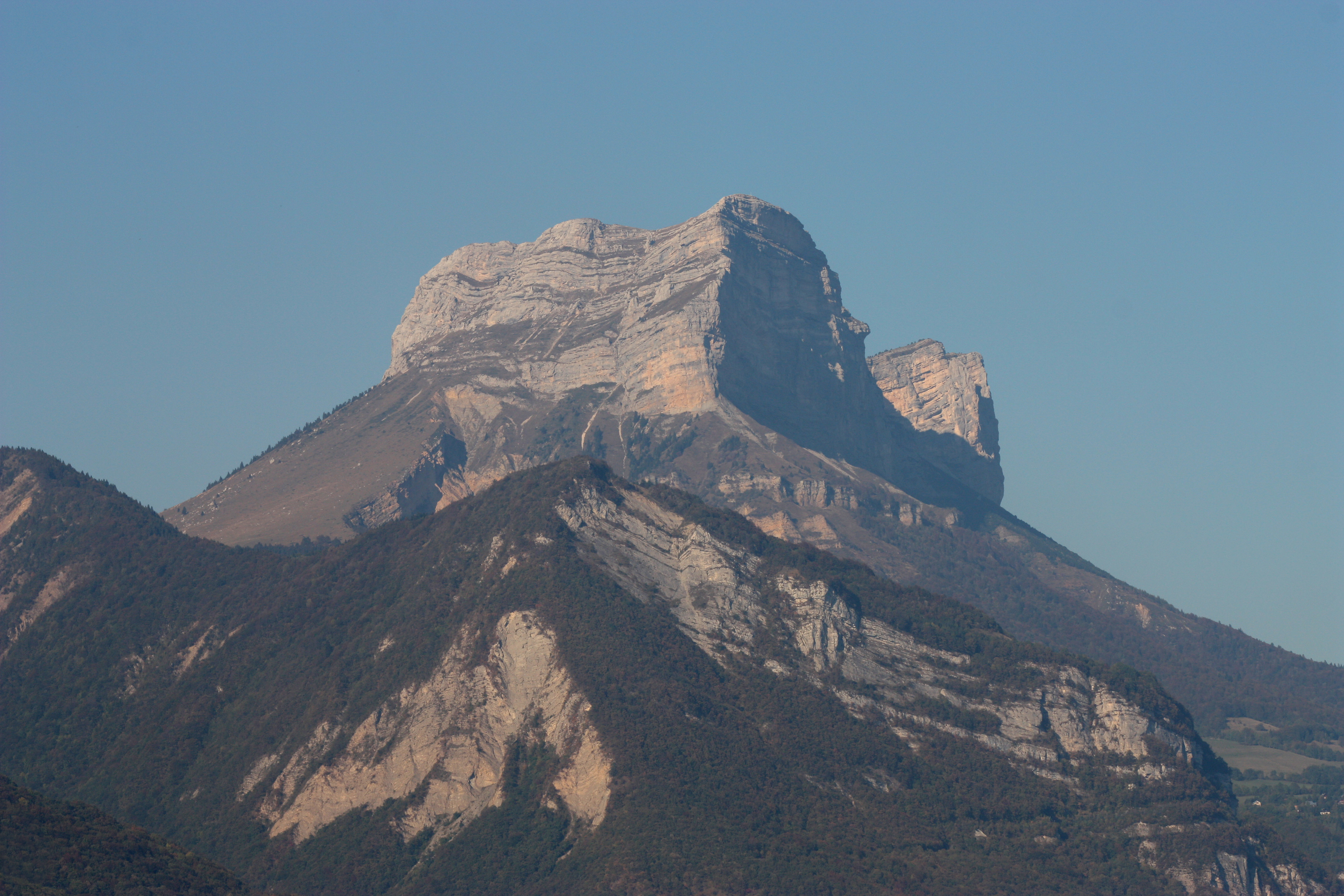
The Dent de Crolles

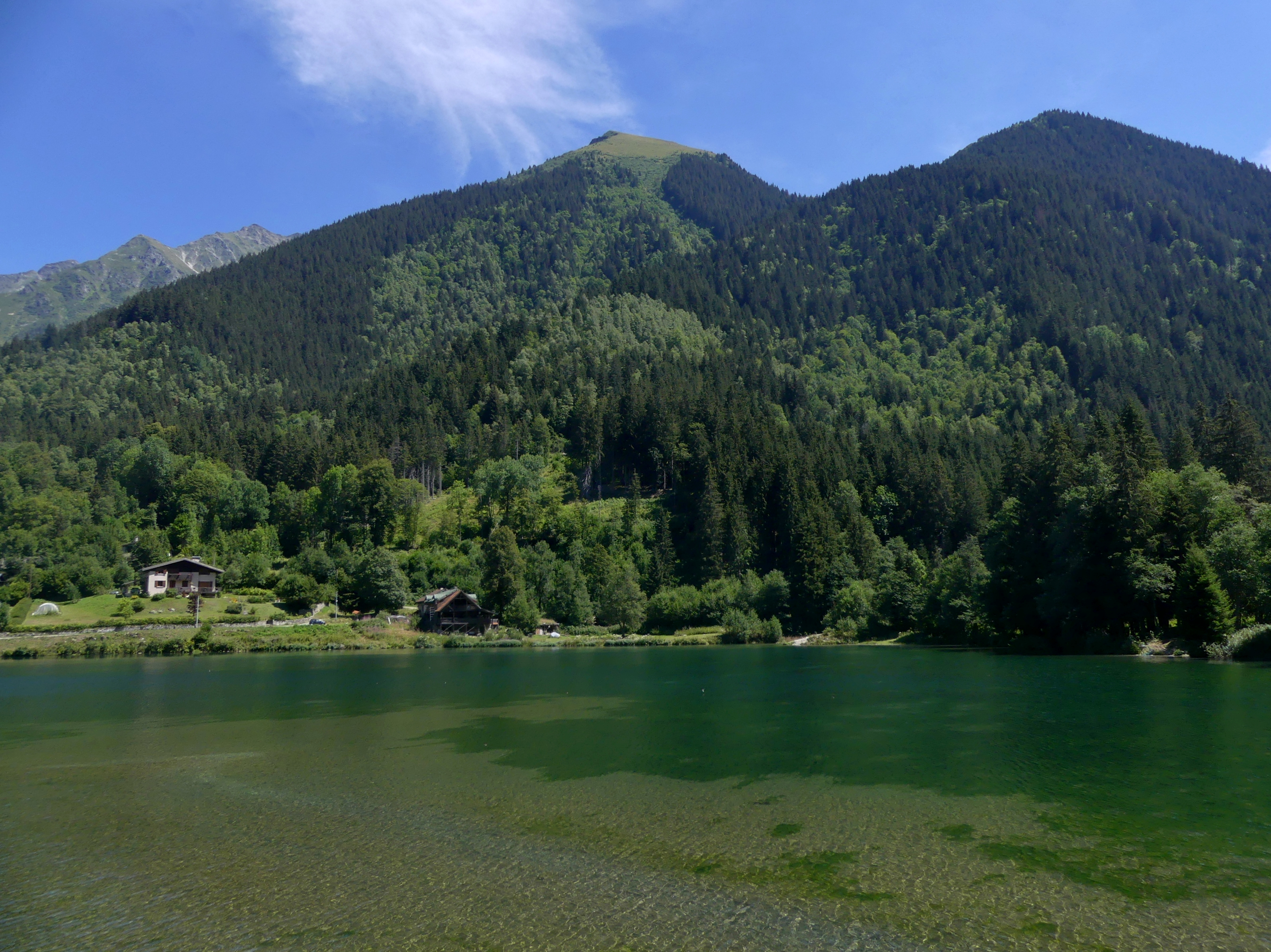
Le Haut-Bréda

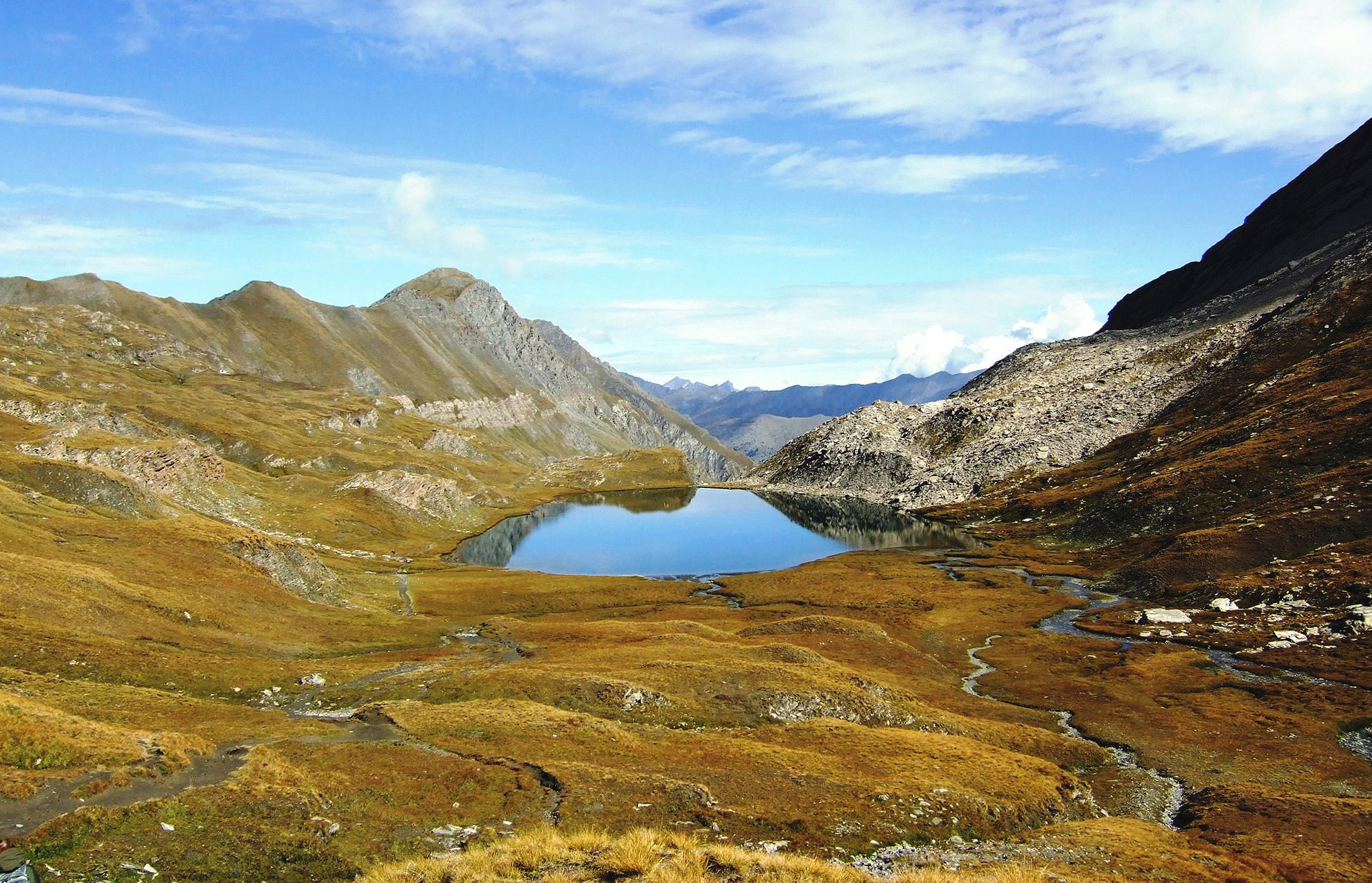
Queyras Valley

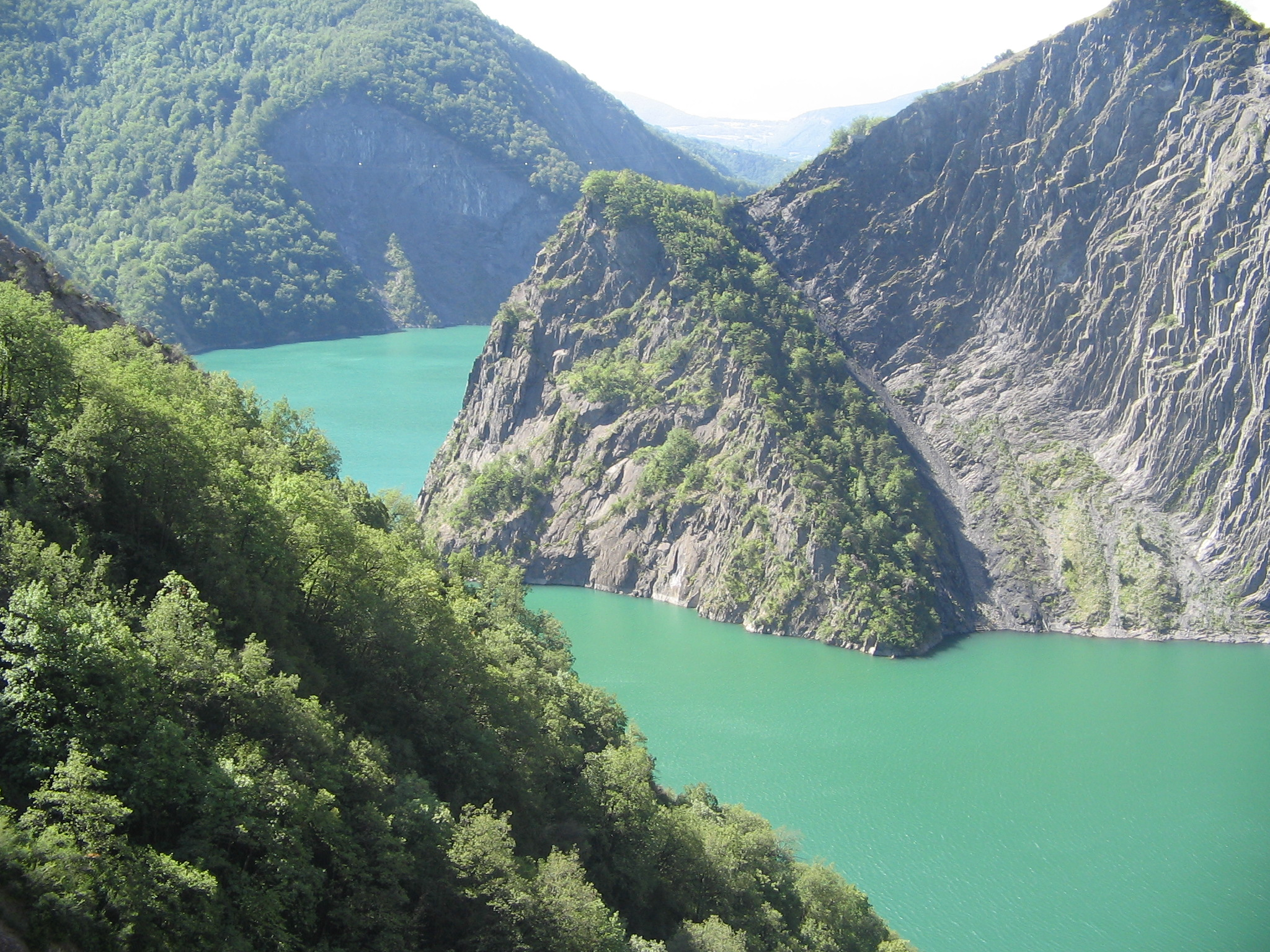
Lac de Monteynard-Avignonet

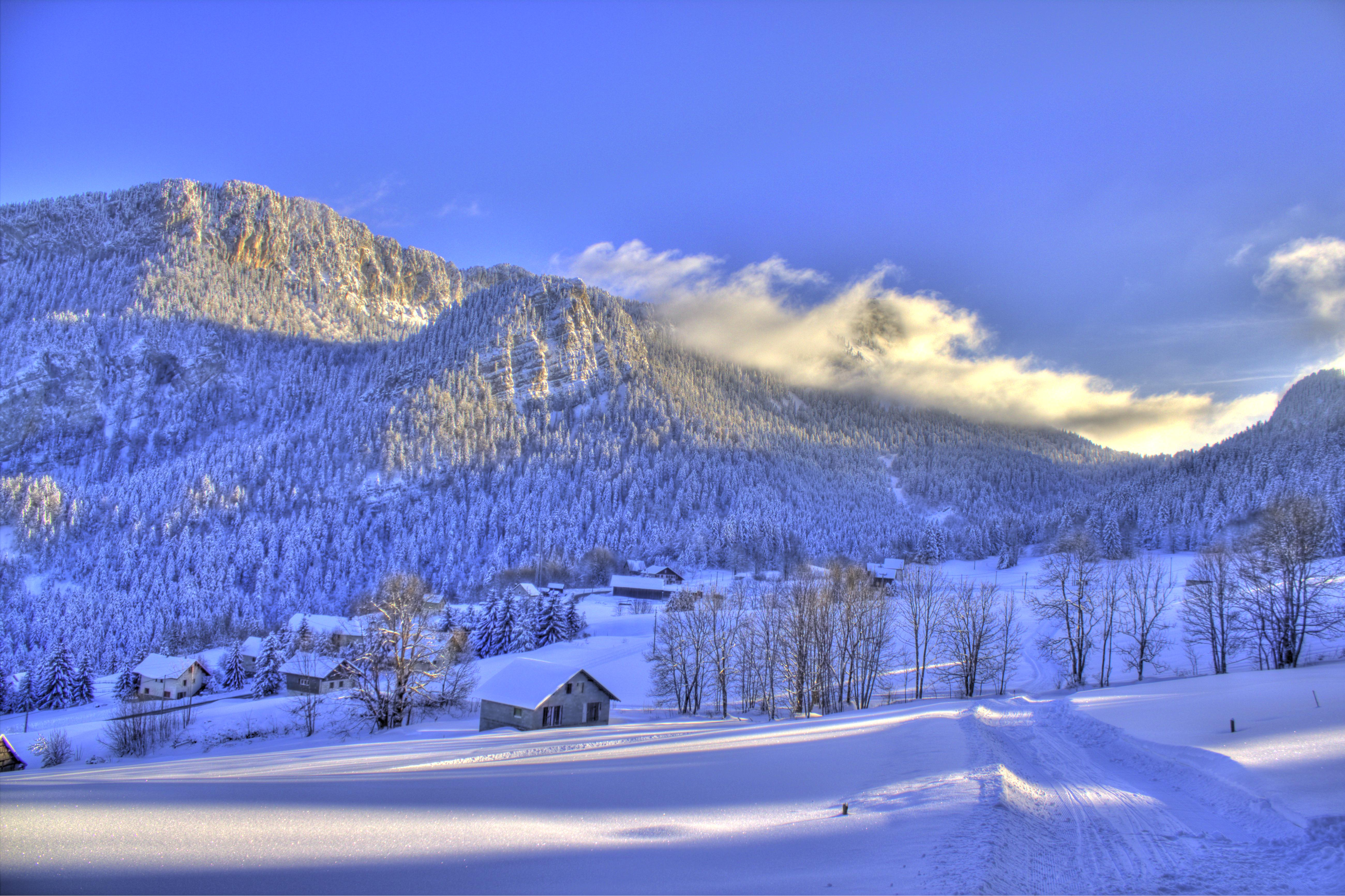
Saint-Christophe-sur-Guiers

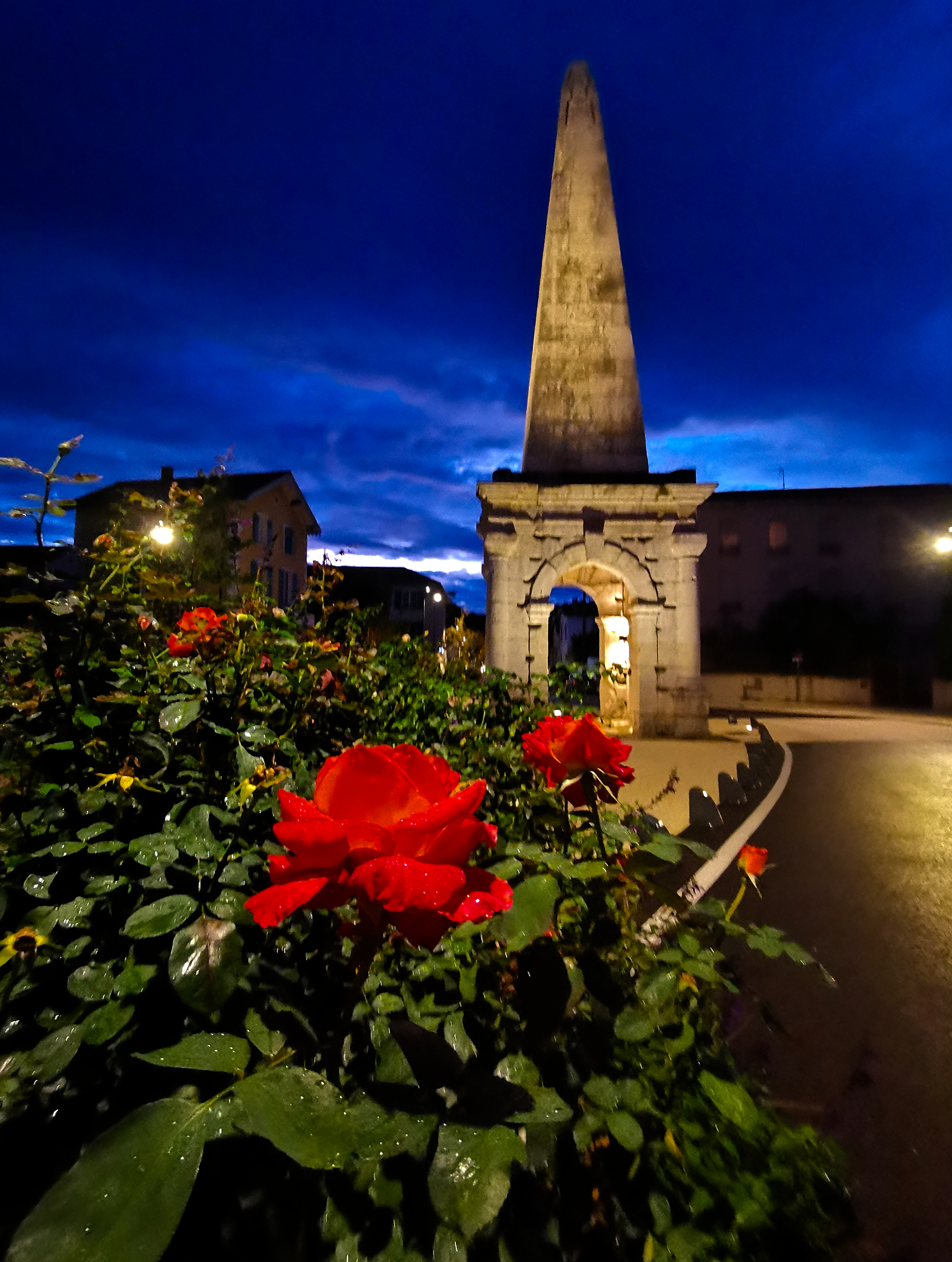
Roman stela nicknamed "the pyramid", Vienne

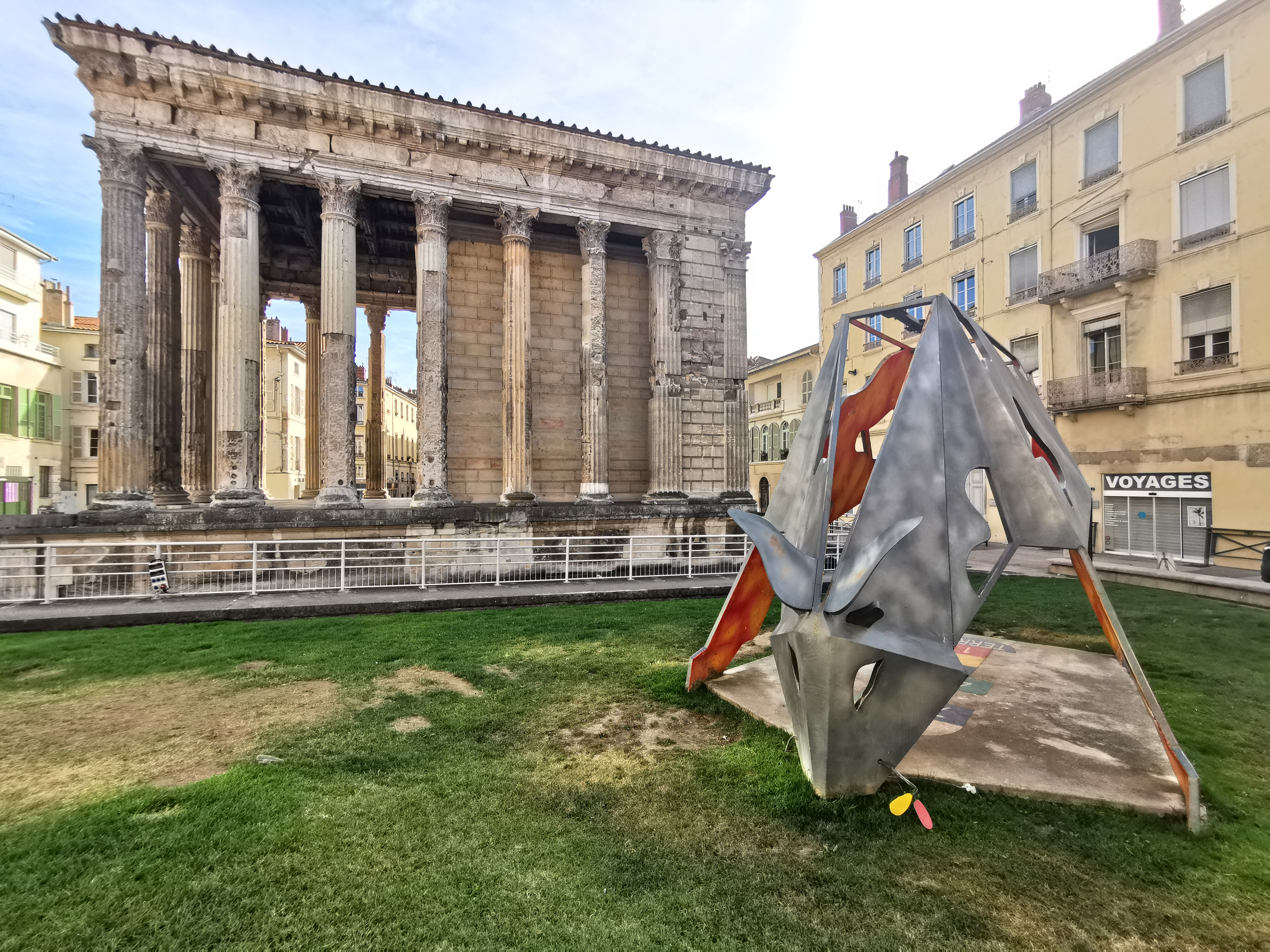
Temple of Augustus and Livia, Vienne

== See also ==
- Cantons of the Isère department
- Charmant Som
- Communes of the Isère department
- Arrondissements of the Isère department
- Chartreuse Mountains
- Grande Sure
- Isère departmental council
