= A46 autoroute =

Road in France

A46 autoroute

Route information
- Part of E15 / E70
- Maintained by DIR Centre-Est, APRR and ASF
- Length: 59 km (37 mi)
- Existed: 1992–present

Major junctions
- North end: E15 / A 6 in Anse

- E70 / A 466 in Quincieux; E70 / A 432 in Miribel; E611 / A 42 in Vaulx-en-Velin and Neyron; E70 / N 346 in Neyron and Saint-Priest; E711 / A 43 in Saint-Priest

- South end: E15 / A 7 / A 47 in Ternay

Location
- Country: France

Highway system
- Roads in France; Autoroutes; Routes nationales

The A46 autoroute is a 61.2-kilometre-long (38.0 mi) highway in central France. It connects the town of Givors to Anse and eastern Lyon. It was completed in 1992.

== Characteristics ==
- 2x2 lanes (2X3 lanes at Rillieux-la-Pape)
- 65 km long
- A radar speed trap has been installed at Rillieux-la-Pape (southbound). Speed limit 90 km/h.

== History ==
- 1992 : Opening of the A46 and the RN346.
- 2007 : Opening of the third lane between Genay and the Mionnay Service Area.

Since 2002, there have been further attempts to prohibit heavy traffic over 7.5 tons in Lyon and divert them onto this motorway-by-pass. This is controversial because it generates extra journey times distances travelled.

== Junctions ==
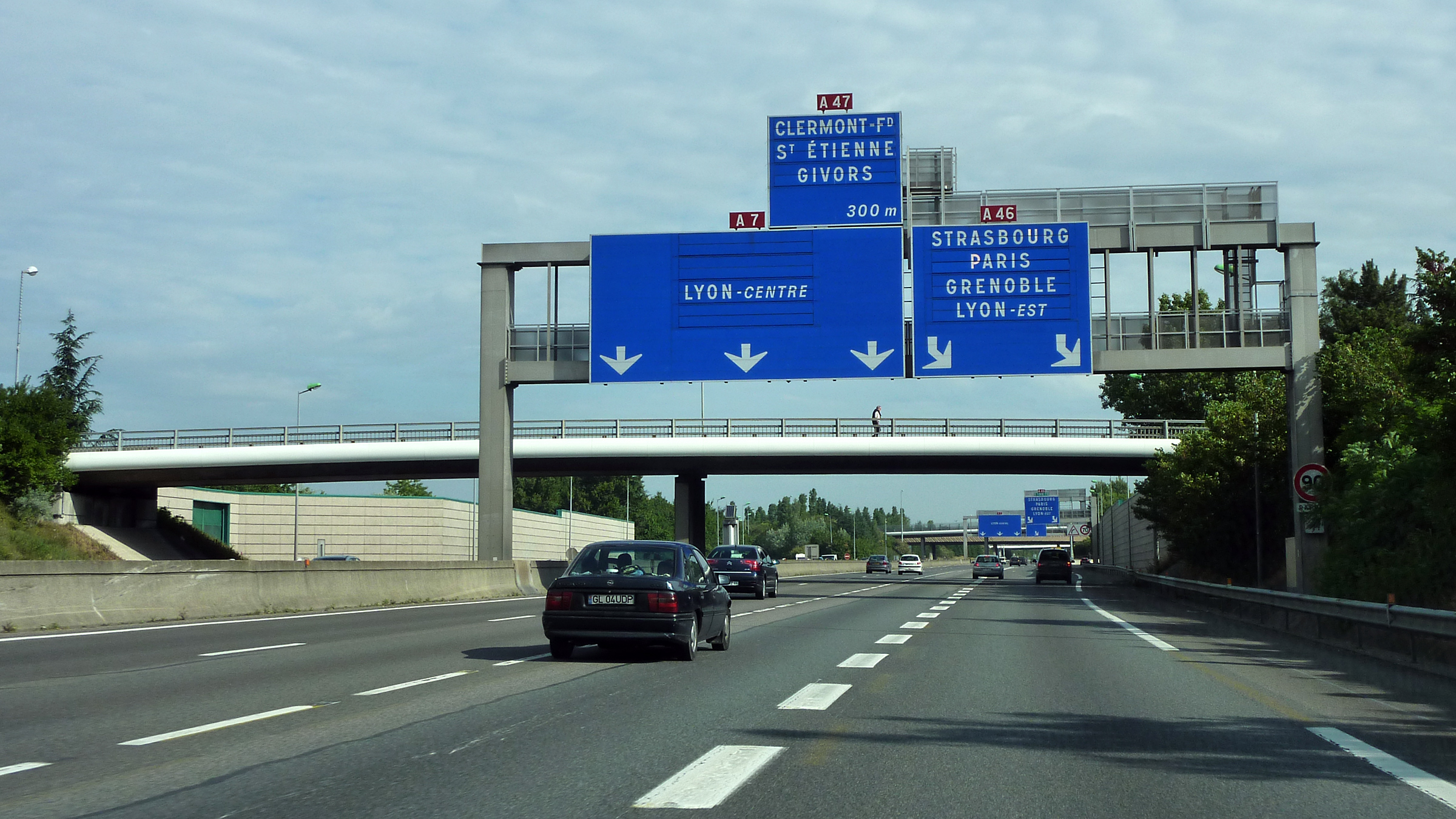
Junction Autoroute A7 to A46 near Lyon

Region	Department	Junction	Destinations	Notes
Auvergne-Rhône-Alpes	Rhône	A6 - A46	Paris, Villefranche-sur-Saône, Mâcon	
Auvergne-Rhône-Alpes	Rhône	1 : Quincieux	Quincieux, Trévoux, Ambérieux d'Azergues	
Auvergne-Rhône-Alpes	Rhône	A466 - A46	Lyon - ouest (M6), Clermont-Ferrand, Bordeaux (A89)	Entry and exit from A7
Auvergne-Rhône-Alpes	Rhône	E15 / A 46 becomes E15 / E70 / A 46		
Auvergne-Rhône-Alpes	Rhône	2 : Genay	Genay, Trévoux, Neuville-sur-Saône, Z. I. Lyon - Nord	
Auvergne-Rhône-Alpes	Ain	Aire de Mionnay-Saint-Galmier (Southbound); Aire de Mionnay-Chatanay (Northbound)		
Auvergne-Rhône-Alpes	Ain	2.1 : Mionnay	Mionnay, Bourg-en-Bresse, Montanay, Villars-les-Dombes	Entry and exit from A7
Auvergne-Rhône-Alpes	Ain	A432 - A46	Aéroport de Lyon-Saint-Exupéry, Grenoble (A43), Genève (A42)	Entry and exit from A6
Auvergne-Rhône-Alpes	Ain	E15 / E70 / A 46 becomes E15 / A 46		
Auvergne-Rhône-Alpes	Ain	3 : Les Echets	Les Échets, Bourg-en-Bresse, Villars-les-Dombes, Villefranche-sur-Saône	
Auvergne-Rhône-Alpes	Rhône	4 : Rillieux	Caluire-et-Cuire, Rillieux-la-Pape	
Auvergne-Rhône-Alpes	Rhône	A42 - A46	Strasbourg (A39), Genève (A40), Bourg-en-Bresse, Aéroport de Lyon-Saint-Exupéry	
Auvergne-Rhône-Alpes	Rhône	E15 / A 46 overlaps and becomes E15 / A 46 / E611 / A 42		
Auvergne-Rhône-Alpes	Rhône	A42 - A46	Lyon - nord, Villeurbanne	
Auvergne-Rhône-Alpes	Rhône	E15 / A 46 / E611 / A 42 becomes E15 / N 346		
Auvergne-Rhône-Alpes	Rhône	5 : Vaulx-en-Velin	Vaulx-en-Velin, Décines-Charpieu - Les Marais, Parc de Miribel-Jonage	
Auvergne-Rhône-Alpes	Rhône	6 : Meyzieu	Meyzieu, Décines-Charpieu - centre, Le Grand Large	
Auvergne-Rhône-Alpes	Rhône	7 : Parc Olympique Lyonnais	Parc Olympique Lyonnais	
Auvergne-Rhône-Alpes	Rhône	7.1 : Pusignan	Pont-de-Chéruy, Pusignan, Z. I. Meyzieu	
Auvergne-Rhône-Alpes	Rhône	8 : Genas	Genas, Chassieu - centre, Les Sept Chemins, Eurexpo - Visiteurs	
Auvergne-Rhône-Alpes	Rhône	9 : Z. I. Mi-Plaine	Z. I. Mi-Plaine, Chassieu, Genas, Eurexpo - Exposants	
Auvergne-Rhône-Alpes	Rhône	10 : Saint-Bonnet-de-Mure	Grenoble, Chambéry par RD, Saint-Bonnet-de-Mure, Z. I. Mi-Plaine, Saint-Priest	
Auvergne-Rhône-Alpes	Rhône	A43 - RN 346 & A46	Grenoble, Chambéry, Turin, Aéroport de Lyon-Saint-Exupéry, Lyon - est	
Auvergne-Rhône-Alpes	Rhône	E15 / N 346 becomes again E15 / A 46		
Auvergne-Rhône-Alpes	Rhône	11 : Saint-Priest - Bel-Air	Saint-Priest	
Auvergne-Rhône-Alpes	Rhône	12 : Saint-Priest - centre	Saint-Priest, Heyrieux, Mions - Les Meurières	
Auvergne-Rhône-Alpes	Rhône	13 : Mions	Mions - centre, Z. I. Lyon - Sud-Est / Pierres Blanches	
Auvergne-Rhône-Alpes	Rhône	14 : Corbas	Vénissieux, Corbas, Z. I. Lyon - Sud-Est / Montmartin (Boulevard urbain sud de Lyon), Lyon - sud	
Auvergne-Rhône-Alpes	Rhône	15 : Saint-Symphorien-d'Ozon	Saint-Symphorien-d'Ozon, Corbas, Marennes, Chaponnay	
Auvergne-Rhône-Alpes	Rhône	16 : Communay	Ternay, Communay	
Auvergne-Rhône-Alpes	Rhône	Aire de Communay		
Auvergne-Rhône-Alpes	Rhône	17 : Les Platières	Z. A. des Platières, Z. A. de Charvas	Exit only from A7
Auvergne-Rhône-Alpes	Rhône	A7 & A47 - A46	Marseille, Valence, Vienne	
Auvergne-Rhône-Alpes	Rhône	A7 & A47 - A46	Saint-Étienne, Givors, Chasse-sur-Rhône, Clermont-Ferrand (A72)	
1.000 mi = 1.609 km; 1.000 km = 0.621 mi
