= A432 autoroute =

Road in France

A432 autoroute

Route information
- Part of E70
- Length: 35 km (22 mi)
- Existed: 1975–present

Major junctions
- North end: E15 / E70 / A 46 in Miribel

- E611 / A 42 in La Boisse

- South end: E70 / E711 / A 43 in Saint-Laurent-de-Mure

Location
- Country: France

Highway system
- Roads in France; Autoroutes; Routes nationales

The A432 autoroute is a motorway in Lyon, France. It connects the A46 with the A42 and A43 serving the airport Lyon Saint-Exupéry.

With the northern segment of the A46 it allows the traffic Paris–Marseille, French Riviera to avoid Lyon.

== List of exits and junctions ==
Region	Department	km	mi	Junctions	Destinations	Notes
Auvergne-Rhône-Alpes	Ain	0,0	0.0	A46 - A432	Paris, Villefranche-sur-Saône, Mâcon, Dijon, Clermont-Ferrand	Entry and exit from A46 (Paris)
Auvergne-Rhône-Alpes	Ain	11,5	7.14	A42 - A432	Lyon, Strasbourg, Genève, Bourg-en-Bresse	
Auvergne-Rhône-Alpes	Péage de La Boisse					
Auvergne-Rhône-Alpes	Rhône & Isère	20,7	12.8	3 : Pusignan	Aéroport de Lyon-Saint-Exupéry, Villette-d'Anthon, Meyzieu, Pont-de-Chéruy, Charvieu-Chavagneux, Pusignan	
Auvergne-Rhône-Alpes	Rhône	29,5	18.3	4 : Saint-Laurent-de-Mure	Saint-Laurent-de-Mure, Saint-Bonnet-de-Mure, Colombier-Saugnieu	Entry end exit from Paris
Auvergne-Rhône-Alpes	Rhône	31,5	19.5	5 : Aéroport de Lyon-Saint-Exupéry	Aéroport de Lyon-Saint-Exupéry, Saint-Laurent-de-Mure, Colombier-Saugnieu	Entry and exit from Marseille
Auvergne-Rhône-Alpes	Rhône	Péage de Saint-Exupéry				
Auvergne-Rhône-Alpes	Rhône	35	21.7	A43 - A432	Lyon, Saint-Étienne, Marseille, Grenoble, Chambéry, L'Isle-d'Abeau	
1.000 mi = 1.609 km; 1.000 km = 0.621 mi
