= A42 autoroute =

Road in France

A42 autoroute

Route information
- Part of E15 / E611
- Maintained by DIR Centre-Est and APRR
- Length: 53.3 km (33.1 mi)
- Existed: 1987–present

Major junctions
- South end: Boulevard périphérique de Lyon in Villeurbanne
- E15 / A 46 in Vaulx-en-Velin and Neyron; E70 / A 432 in La Boisse

- North end: E21 / E62 / A 40 in Druillat

Location
- Country: France

Highway system
- Roads in France; Autoroutes; Routes nationales

The A42 autoroute is a short motorway in France. Being completed in 1987, the road connects the city of Lyon to its junction with the A40 roughly 50 km north-east of Lyon.

== Characteristics ==
- 2x2 lanes
- 2x3 lanes between Lyon and Pérouges (26 km)
- 70 km long
- Service areas

== History ==
- 1983: Section between Neyron and Chazey (30 km) opened
- 1988: Section between Chazey and Pont-d'Ain (19.5 km) opened

== Lists of exits and junctions ==
Region	Department	Junction	Destinations	Notes
Auvergne-Rhône-Alpes	Rhône	Boulevard périphérique de Lyon - A42	Périphérique Nord : Clermont-Ferrand, Roanne (A89), Lyon - centre, Porte de la Doua	
Auvergne-Rhône-Alpes	Rhône	Boulevard périphérique de Lyon - A42	Périphérique Sud : Marseille (A7), Grenoble (A43), Porte de Cusset	
Auvergne-Rhône-Alpes	Rhône	1/1b : Villeurbanne	Villeurbanne - Croix-Luizet, Saint-Jean, Vaulx-en-Velin	
Auvergne-Rhône-Alpes	Rhône	1a : Vaulx-en-Velin	Vaulx-en-Velin - centre	
Auvergne-Rhône-Alpes	Rhône	RN 346 - A42	Marseille (A7), Grenoble (A43)	
Auvergne-Rhône-Alpes	Rhône	E611 / A 42 overlaps and becomes E611 / A 42 / E15 / A 46		
Auvergne-Rhône-Alpes	Rhône	A46 - A42	Paris (A6), Villefranche-sur-Saône, Clermont-Ferrand (A89)	
Auvergne-Rhône-Alpes	Rhône	E611 / A 42 / E15 / A 46 becomes again E611 / A 42		
Auvergne-Rhône-Alpes	Ain	4 : Miribel	Neyron, Miribel, Parc de Miribel-Jonage	
Auvergne-Rhône-Alpes	Ain	5 : Beynost	Beynost, Genève, Saint-Maurice-de-Beynost	
Auvergne-Rhône-Alpes	Ain	Péage de Beynost		
Auvergne-Rhône-Alpes	Ain	A432 - A42	Saint-Exupéry, Grenoble (A48), Chambéry, Paris, Villefranche-sur-Saône, Saint-Etienne (A47), Marseille (A7), Clermont-Ferrand (A89)	
Auvergne-Rhône-Alpes	Ain	5.1 : La Boisse - Montluel	La Boisse, Montluel	
Auvergne-Rhône-Alpes	Ain	Aire de Lyon - Montluel (Eastbound); Aire de Lyon - Dagneux (Westbound)		
Auvergne-Rhône-Alpes	Ain	6 : Balan	Dagneux, Balan	
Auvergne-Rhône-Alpes	Ain	7 : Pérouges	Pérouges, Meximieux, Lagnieu, Z. I. Plaine de l'Ain	
Auvergne-Rhône-Alpes	Ain	Aire de Brotteaux (Eastbound); Aire de Chazey-sur-Ain (Westbound)		
Auvergne-Rhône-Alpes	Ain	8 : Ambérieu-en-Bugey	Ambérieu-en-Bugey, Lagnieu, Chambéry	
Auvergne-Rhône-Alpes	Ain	9 : Pont-d'Ain	Pont-d'Ain	
Auvergne-Rhône-Alpes	Ain	A40 - A42	Paris (A6), Strasbourg (A39), Milan, Genève, Oyonnax, Bourg-en-Bresse	
1.000 mi = 1.609 km; 1.000 km = 0.621 mi
