= A432 =

A432 may refer to:

- A432 motorway (France)
- A432 road (England)
- EML Tasuja (A432), a ship
- A432, an alternative pitch standard; see Concert pitch#19th- and 20th-century standards
