= E611 =

E611 can refer to:

- E 611 road (United Arab Emirates)
- European route E611, a route in France part of the international E-road network
- E611, a designation for a railcar type used in the Japanese E6 Series Shinkansen electrical multiple unit
