= Colombier-Saugnieu =

- Commune
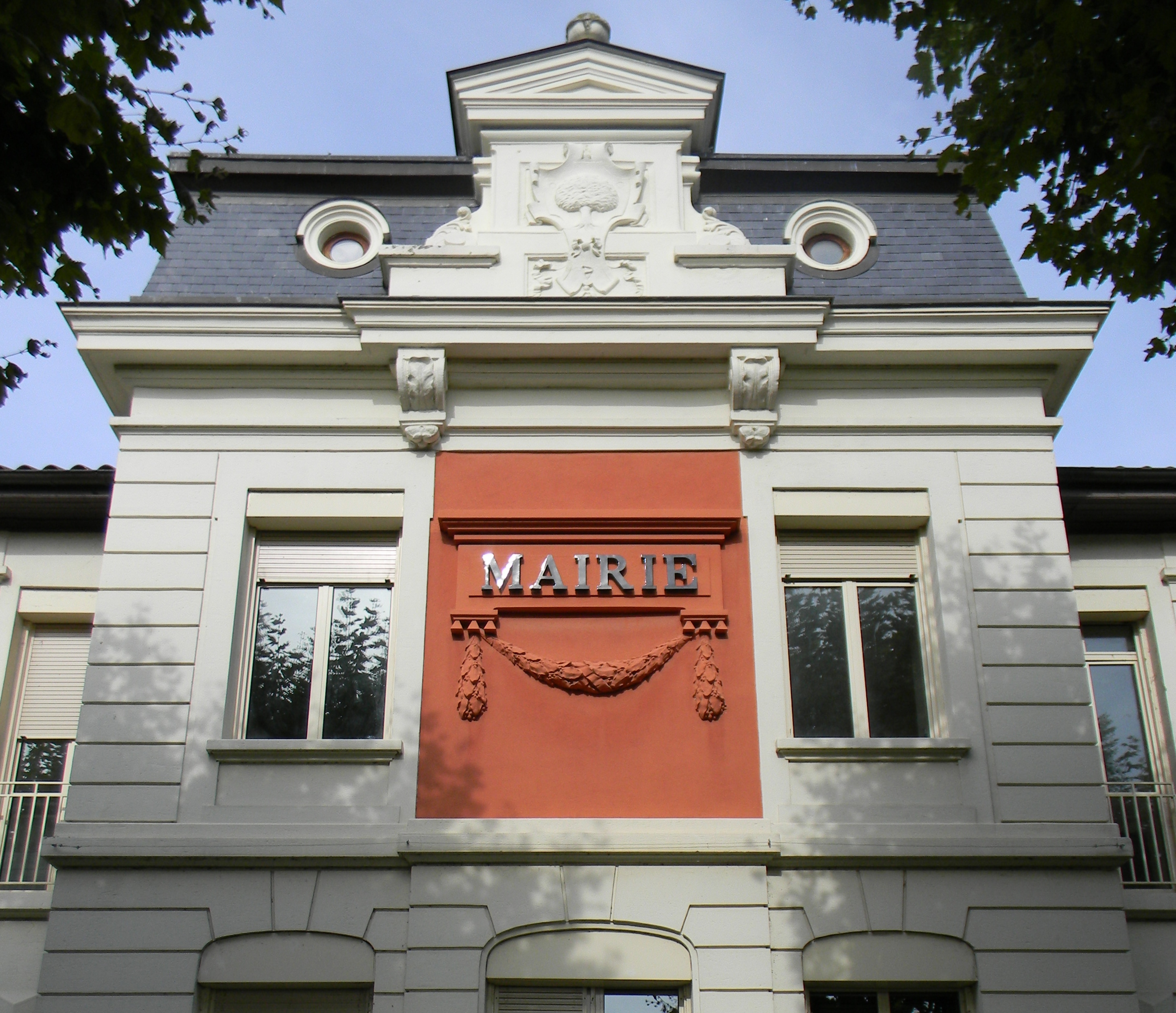
- The town hall in Colombier-Saugnieu

- Coat of arms
- Location of Colombier-Saugnieu
- Location within France Location within Auvergne-Rhône-Alpes
- Coordinates: 45°42′44″N 5°06′46″E
- Country: France
- Region: Auvergne-Rhône-Alpes
- Department: Rhône
- Arrondissement: Lyon
- Canton: Genas
- Intercommunality: CC de l'Est Lyonnais

Government
  - Mayor (2020–2026): Pierre Marmonier
- Area^{1}: 27.62 km^{2} (10.66 sq mi)
- Highest elevation: 277 m (909 ft)
- Lowest elevation: 200 m (660 ft)
- Population (2023): 2,874
  - Density: 104.1/km^{2} (269.5/sq mi)
- Demonym: Colombards
- Time zone: UTC+01:00 (CET)
  - Summer (DST): UTC+02:00 (CEST)
- INSEE/Postal code: 69299 /69124
- Website: www.mairie-colombiersaugnieu.fr
- ^{1} French Land Register data, which excludes lakes, ponds, glaciers > 1 km^{2} (0.386 sq mi or 247 acres) and river estuaries.

Colombier-Saugnieu (French pronunciation: [kɔlɔ̃bjesoɲø]) is the easternmost commune in the Rhône department, on the border with Isère, in the Auvergne-Rhône-Alpes region in central-eastern France.

== Geography ==
The river Bourbre forms part of the commune's eastern border. Lyon-Saint-Exupéry TGV station and most of Lyon–Saint-Exupéry Airport (a small part in the north is in Pusignan) are in the commune. It is part of the public transport zone of Rhônexpress, although the rail link does not serve the villages of Colombier (which houses the town hall), Saugnieu and Montcul east of the airport.

== Population ==
Historical population
Year	Pop.	±% p.a.
1968	812	—
1975	942	+2.14%
1982	1,127	+2.59%
1990	1,833	+6.27%
1999	2,083	+1.43%
2007	2,261	+1.03%
2012	2,495	+1.99%
2017	2,613	+0.93%
2023	2,874	+1.60%
Source: INSEE

== Education ==
The commune has a primary school, the Groupe Scolaire Jules Ferry.

== Politics ==
Since 2008, Pierre Marmonier has held the mayorship of Colombier-Saugnieu. He was re-elected in the 2020 municipal election.

== See also ==
- Communes of the Rhône department
