= Canton of Genas =

Coordinates: 45.7322°N 5.0028°E

Genas
- Canton
- Country: France
- Region: Auvergne-Rhône-Alpes
- Department: Rhône
- No. of communes: {{{nbcomm}}}
- Area: 141.18 km^{2} (54.51 sq mi)
- Population (2023): 42,629
  - Density: 301.95/km^{2} (782.04/sq mi)
- INSEE code: 6906

The Canton of Genas is a French administrative division, located in the Rhône department.

The canton was established by decree of 27 February 2014 which came into force in March 2015.

== Composition ==
The canton of Genas is composed of 8 communes:

Communes	Population (2012)
Colombier-Saugnieu	2,495
Genas	12,355
Jons	1,354
Pusignan	3,730
Saint-Bonnet-de-Mure	6,822
Saint-Laurent-de-Mure	5,326
Saint-Pierre-de-Chandieu	4,651
Toussieu	2,456

== See also ==
- Cantons of the Rhône department
- Communes of the Rhône department
