= Arrondissements of the Isère department =

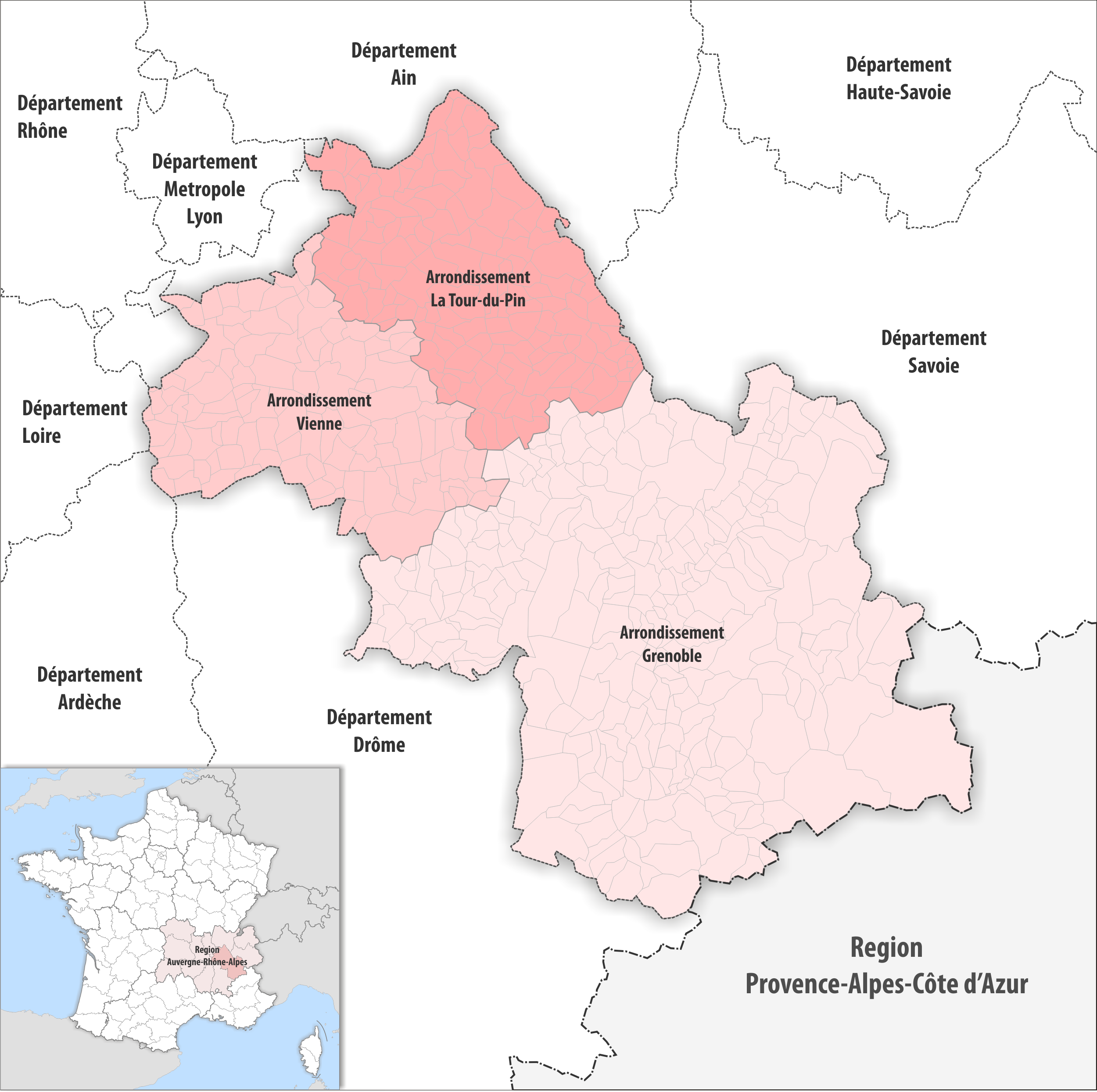
Map of arrondissements of the Isère department.

The 3 arrondissements of the Isère department are:

1. Arrondissement of Grenoble, (prefecture of the Isère department: Grenoble) with 263 communes. The population of the arrondissement was 748,885 in 2021.
2. Arrondissement of La Tour-du-Pin, (subprefecture: La Tour-du-Pin) with 136 communes. The population of the arrondissement was 315,625 in 2021.
3. Arrondissement of Vienne, (subprefecture: Vienne) with 113 communes. The population of the arrondissement was 220,438 in 2021.

== History ==
In 1800 the arrondissements of Grenoble, Saint-Marcellin, La Tour-du-Pin and Vienne were established. The arrondissement of Saint-Marcellin was disbanded in 1926.

The borders of the arrondissements of Isère were modified in January 2017:

- 24 communes from the arrondissement of Grenoble to the arrondissement of Vienne
- one commune from the arrondissement of La Tour-du-Pin to the arrondissement of Vienne
- six communes from the arrondissement of Vienne to the arrondissement of La Tour-du-Pin
