= Saint-Pierre-de-Chandieu =

- Commune
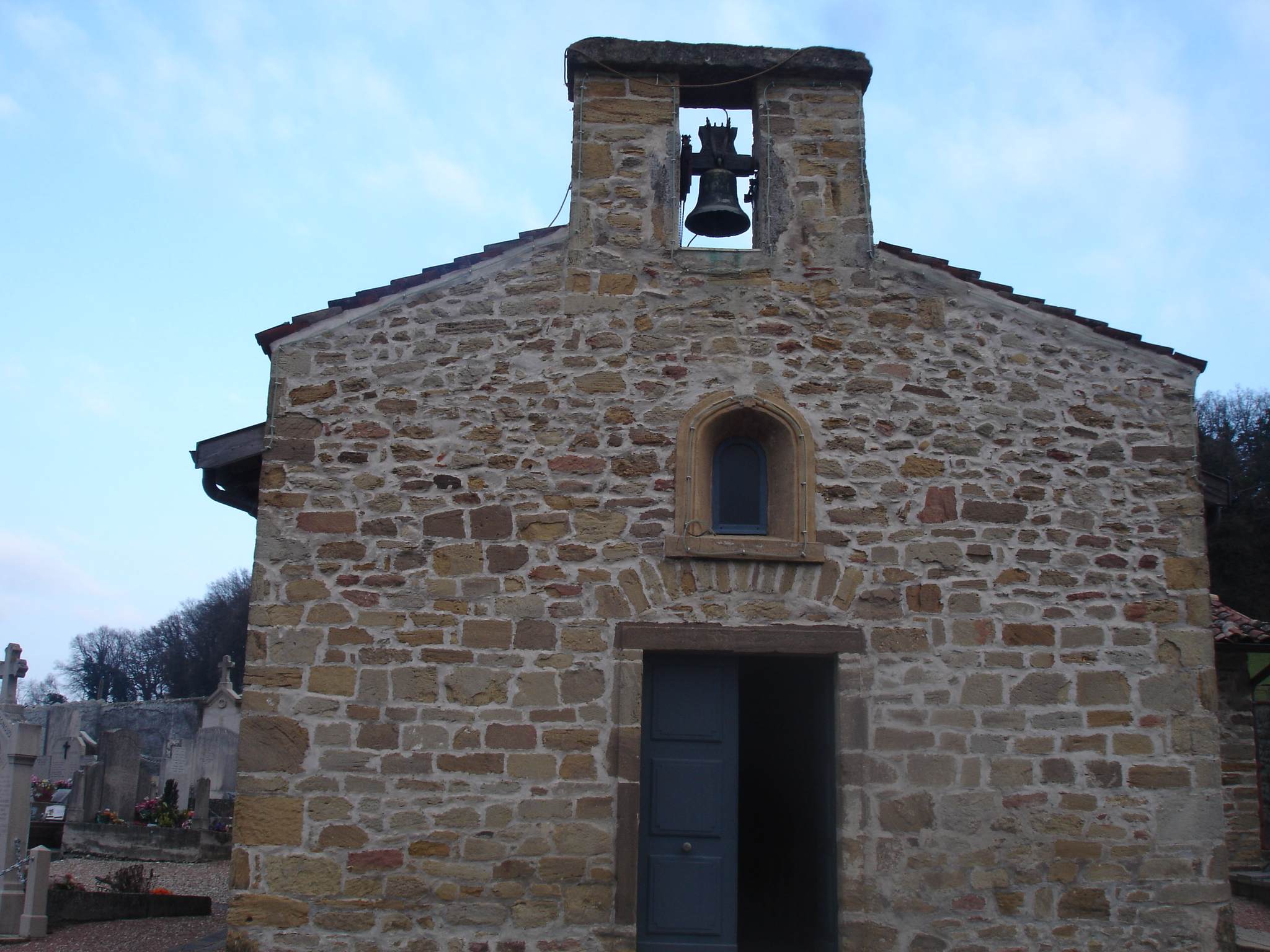
- Chapel of St. Thomas

- Coat of arms
- Location of Saint-Pierre-de-Chandieu
- Location within France Location within Auvergne-Rhône-Alpes
- Coordinates: 45°38′50″N 5°00′56″E
- Country: France
- Region: Auvergne-Rhône-Alpes
- Department: Rhône
- Arrondissement: Lyon
- Canton: Genas
- Intercommunality: CC de l'Est lyonnais

Government
  - Mayor (2020–2026): Raphaël Ibanez
- Area^{1}: 29.28 km^{2} (11.31 sq mi)
- Elevation: 365 m (1,198 ft)
- Highest elevation: 369 m (1,211 ft)
- Lowest elevation: 215 m (705 ft)
- Population (2023): 4,616
  - Density: 157.7/km^{2} (408.3/sq mi)
- Time zone: UTC+01:00 (CET)
  - Summer (DST): UTC+02:00 (CEST)
- INSEE/Postal code: 69289 /69780
- ^{1} French Land Register data, which excludes lakes, ponds, glaciers > 1 km^{2} (0.386 sq mi or 247 acres) and river estuaries.

Saint-Pierre-de-Chandieu (French pronunciation: [sɛ̃ pjɛʁ də ʃɑ̃djø]) is a commune in the Rhône department in eastern France.

== Population ==
Historical population
Year	Pop.	±% p.a.
1968	1,431	—
1975	2,314	+7.11%
1982	2,658	+2.00%
1990	3,523	+3.58%
1999	4,133	+1.79%
2007	4,407	+0.81%
2012	4,651	+1.08%
2017	4,520	−0.57%
2023	4,616	+0.35%
Source: INSEE

== See also ==
- Communes of the Rhône department
