= Jons, Rhône =

Jons
- Commune
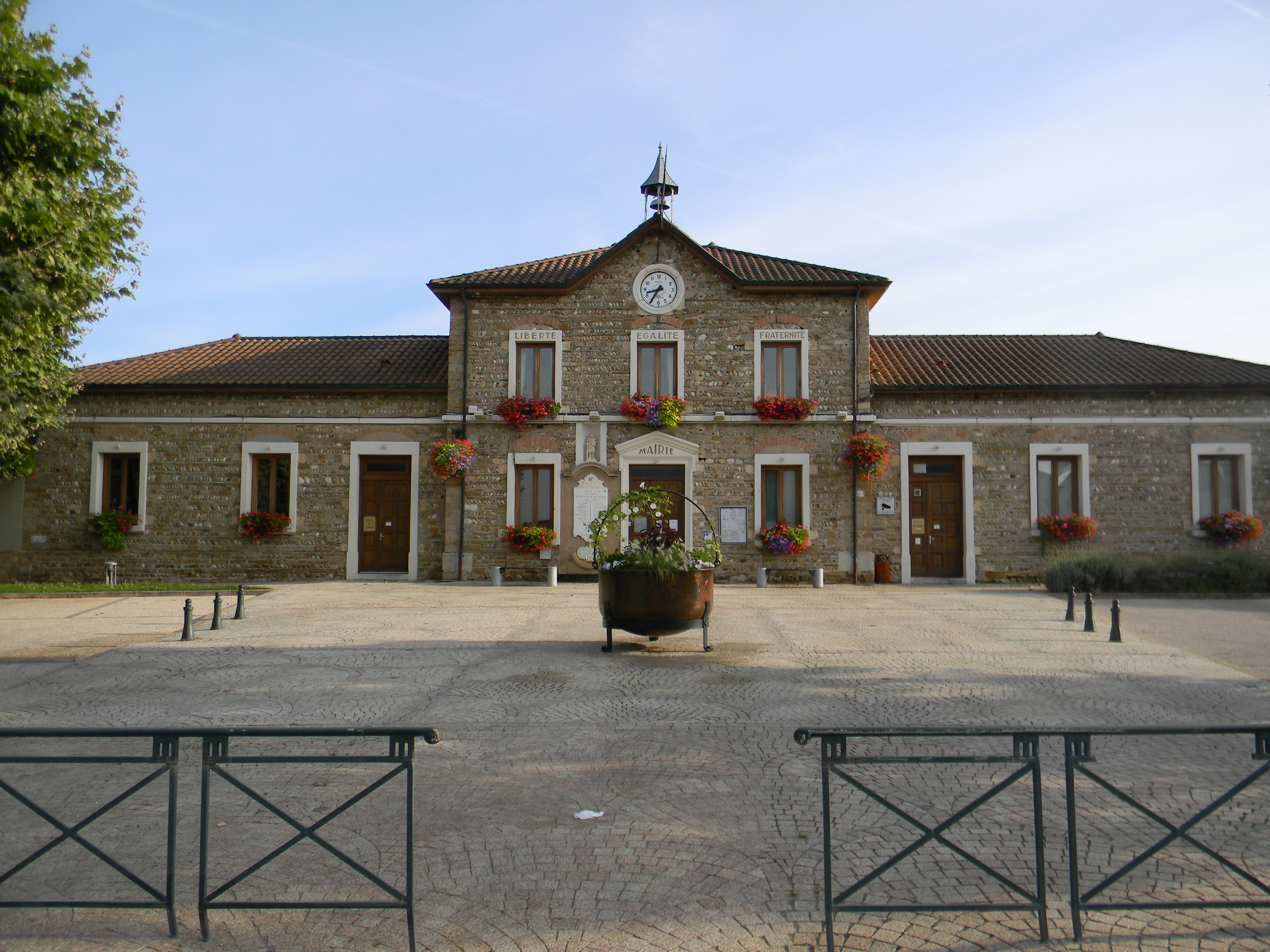
- The town hall in Jons

- Coat of arms
- Location of Jons
- Location within France Location within Auvergne-Rhône-Alpes
- Coordinates: 45°48′07″N 5°05′02″E
- Country: France
- Region: Auvergne-Rhône-Alpes
- Department: Rhône
- Arrondissement: Lyon
- Canton: Genas
- Intercommunality: CC de l'Est Lyonnais

Government
  - Mayor (2020–2026): Claude Villard
- Area^{1}: 7.41 km^{2} (2.86 sq mi)
- Elevation: 226 m (741 ft)
- Highest elevation: 242 m (794 ft)
- Lowest elevation: 175 m (574 ft)
- Population (2023): 1,647
  - Density: 222/km^{2} (576/sq mi)
- Time zone: UTC+01:00 (CET)
  - Summer (DST): UTC+02:00 (CEST)
- INSEE/Postal code: 69280 /69330
- ^{1} French Land Register data, which excludes lakes, ponds, glaciers > 1 km^{2} (0.386 sq mi or 247 acres) and river estuaries.

Jons (French pronunciation: [ʒɔ̃]) is a commune in the Rhône department in Auvergne-Rhône-Alpes region in eastern France. Since 2008, Claude Villard has been the mayor of Jons. He was re-elected in the 2020 municipal elections.

== See also ==
- Communes of the Rhône department
