= Toussieu =

Toussieu Tosi (Arpitan)
- Commune
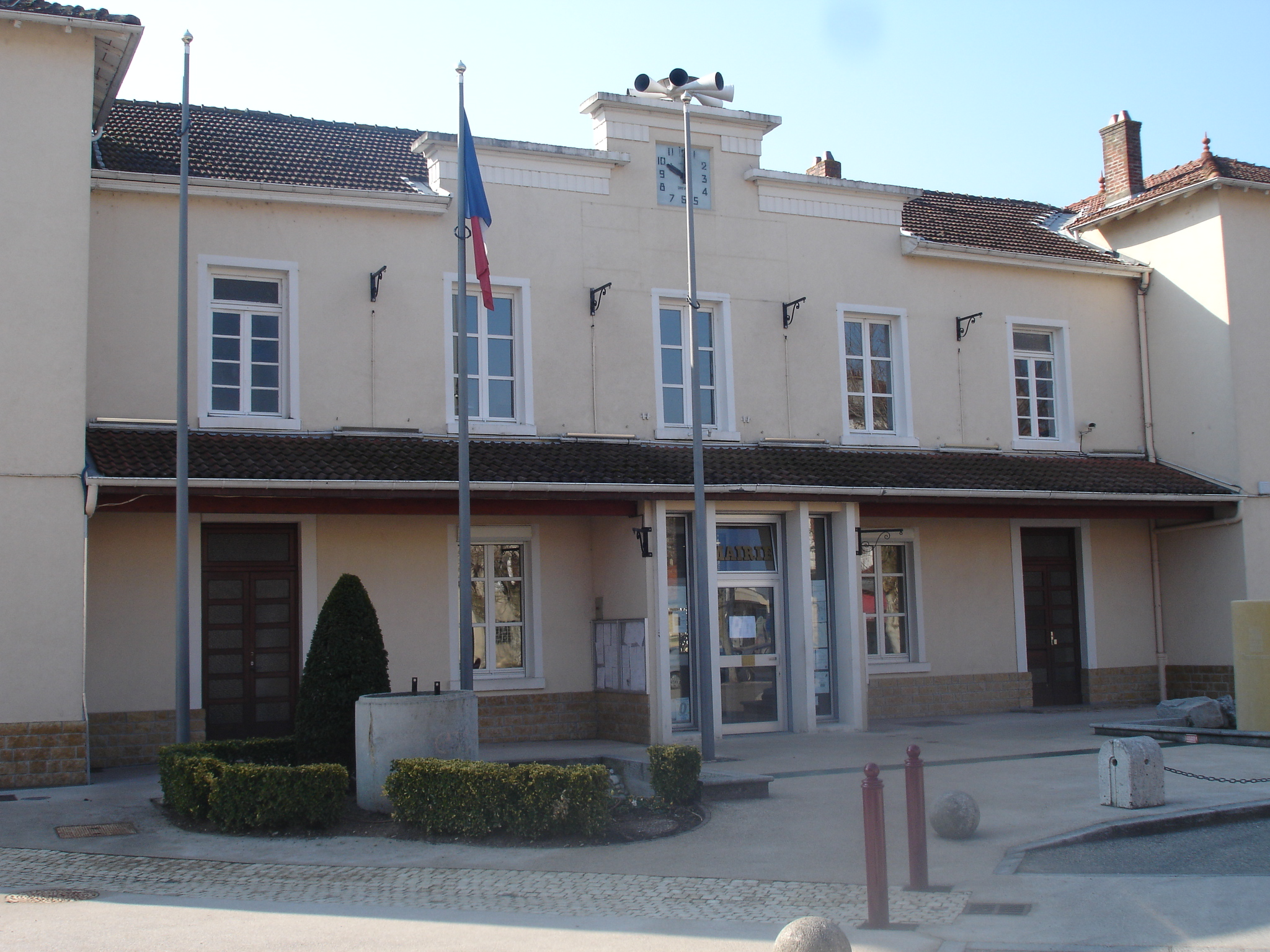
- The town hall in Toussieu

- Coat of arms
- Location of Toussieu
- Location within France Location within Auvergne-Rhône-Alpes
- Coordinates: 45°39′19″N 4°59′09″E
- Country: France
- Region: Auvergne-Rhône-Alpes
- Department: Rhône
- Arrondissement: Lyon
- Canton: Genas
- Intercommunality: CC de l'Est lyonnais

Government
  - Mayor (2026–32): Claude Humbert
- Area^{1}: 5.02 km^{2} (1.94 sq mi)
- Elevation: 242 m (794 ft)
- Highest elevation: 279 m (915 ft)
- Lowest elevation: 225 m (738 ft)
- Population (2023): 3,177
  - Density: 633/km^{2} (1,640/sq mi)
- Time zone: UTC+01:00 (CET)
  - Summer (DST): UTC+02:00 (CEST)
- INSEE/Postal code: 69298 /69780
- ^{1} French Land Register data, which excludes lakes, ponds, glaciers > 1 km^{2} (0.386 sq mi or 247 acres) and river estuaries.

Toussieu (French pronunciation: [tusjø]) is a commune in the Rhône department in eastern France.

== Population ==
Historical population
Year	Pop.	±% p.a.
1968	968	—
1975	1,134	+2.29%
1982	1,517	+4.24%
1990	1,651	+1.06%
1999	2,019	+2.26%
2007	2,367	+2.01%
2012	2,456	+0.74%
2017	3,080	+4.63%
2023	3,177	+0.52%
Source: INSEE

== See also ==
- Communes of the Rhône department
