= Boulevard périphérique de Lyon =

Ring road

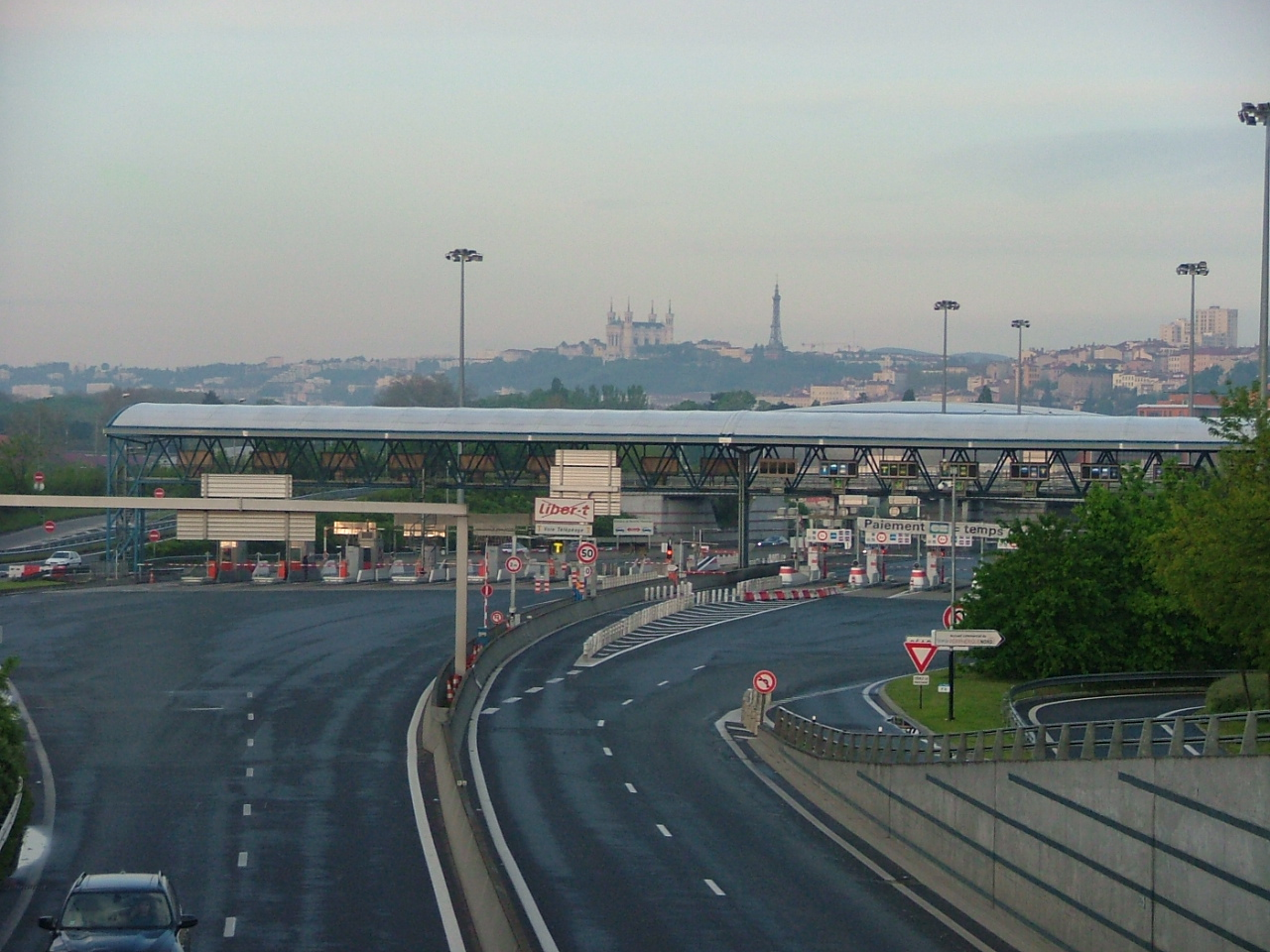
- The Rhône toll between Porte de Saint-Clair and Porte de la Pape. The Fourvière hill is in the background.

Route information
- Length: 25 km (16 mi)
- Existed: 1958–present

Location
- Country: France

Highway system
- Roads in France; Autoroutes; Routes nationales

The Boulevard périphérique de Lyon is a ring road that surrounds Lyon from the northwest (Porte de Valvert, in Tassin-la-Demi-Lune) to the south (Porte de Gerland, in the 7th arrondissement) by making a loop to the east. It has sixteen exits called "gates", and includes a toll portion, between the Porte de Vaise (or the Porte de Rochecardon coming from the east) and the Porte de Saint-Clair (part including the large Caluire Tunnel).

== History ==
=== Boulevard de Ceinture ===
A circular boulevard project emerged in the 1920s to complete the previous east Lyon ring roads further out. It was the Chalumeau plan of 1924 which provided not only for a circular boulevard but also for the connection of the various routes into the city. The Departmental Council of Rhône took the project in hand in 1928, under the leadership of its president Laurent Bonnevay. The chosen route partly occupies the site of the former Croix-Luizet perimeter wall in Gerland, hence its name (large) beltway. Further north, it must also constitute a dike protecting Villeurbanne and Brotteaux from the floods of the Rhône (particularly serious in 1924 and until 1947), before reaching the corner of the Parc de la Tête d'or. To the south, the boulevard must end towards Gerland, near the future port, for a length of 14 km. It is designed as an urban boulevard which must irrigate the city and connect its different districts. It must be 46 m wide, have two carriageways of 10.5 m each, a central reservation of 13 m, in grass and planted with trees, two cycle paths, and two 6 m sidewalks, also planted with trees.

It must also have gigantic roundabouts, up to 150 m in diameter for the connections with the penetrating ones, the loops of the belt. Work began in 1931 with the aim of occupying the unemployed in the department, following the Great Depression. World War II slowed down the work. The boulevard was completed in its initial version in 1958. It was inaugurated in 1960 and took the name of Laurent Bonnevay.

== Attendance and toll receipts ==
The Boulevard périphérique de Lyon is 25 km (16 mi) long and has daily traffic of 150,000 vehicles/day/. The ring road has a paid section called BPNL, boulevardphérique nord lyonnais, which carries an annual traffic of 19 million passages in 2019, i.e. 52,219 daily passages. Toll receipts reached €38.2 million in 2019, this figure having been on the rise since the end of the works in April 2018. The COVID-19 pandemic had a strong impact on receipts, of around -16% on the year, to stand at €32.2 million in 2020 due to the double confinement period in March then in November 2020. The recovery in traffic is observed in 2021 with €36.9 million in revenue, i.e. -4% compared to the level before the pandemic.

== Speed ==
To reduce fine particle pollution, the speed of the Boulevard périphérique de Lyon is limited to 70 km/h (43 mph) from 29 April 2019. This speed limit was also put in place in order reduce the severity of accidents as well as noise pollution, while improving air quality. In the same vein, reflections are carried out within the framework of the Low Emission Zone (ZFE) in order to gradually limit the circulation of vehicles with Crit'air 3, 4, 5 stickers on the defined zone, which to date does not does not include the northern ring road.
