= Genas =

- Commune
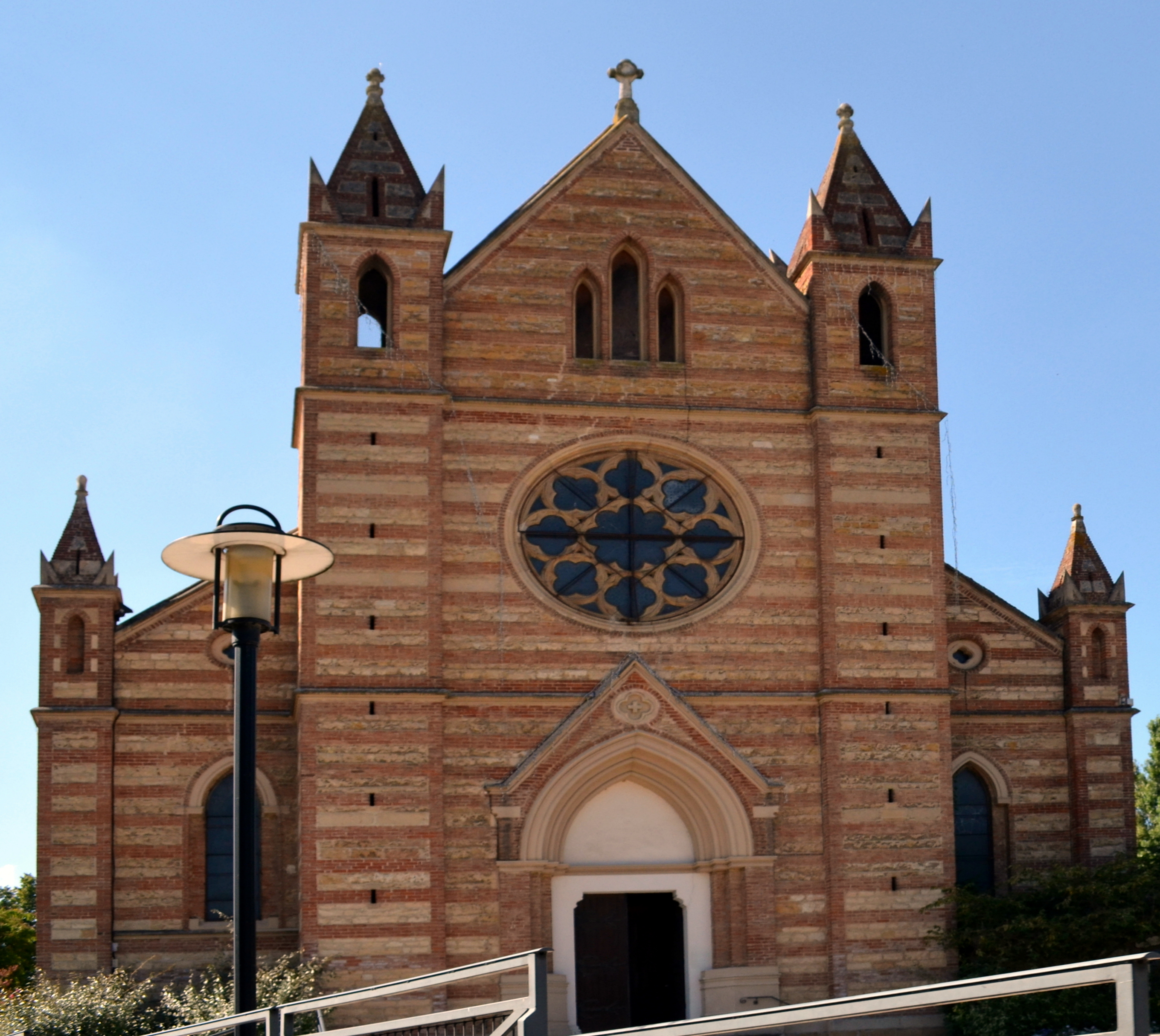
- The church of Saint-Barthélémy in Genas

- Coat of arms
- Location of Genas
- Location within France Location within Auvergne-Rhône-Alpes
- Coordinates: 45°43′56″N 5°00′10″E
- Country: France
- Region: Auvergne-Rhône-Alpes
- Department: Rhône
- Arrondissement: Lyon
- Canton: Genas
- Intercommunality: CC de l'Est Lyonnais

Government
  - Mayor (2020–2026): Daniel Valéro
- Area^{1}: 23.84 km^{2} (9.20 sq mi)
- Elevation: 218 m (715 ft)
- Highest elevation: 263 m (863 ft)
- Lowest elevation: 208 m (682 ft)
- Population (2023): 13,421
  - Density: 563.0/km^{2} (1,458/sq mi)
- Time zone: UTC+01:00 (CET)
  - Summer (DST): UTC+02:00 (CEST)
- INSEE/Postal code: 69277 /69740
- ^{1} French Land Register data, which excludes lakes, ponds, glaciers > 1 km^{2} (0.386 sq mi or 247 acres) and river estuaries.

Genas (French pronunciation: [ʒənas]) is a commune in the Rhône department in eastern France. Since 2008, Daniel Valéro has been the mayor of Genas. He was re-elected in the 2020 municipal elections.

== Geography ==
It is located approximately 14 km (9 mi) east-southeast of Lyon. The town includes the hamlets of Azieu and Vurey.

== History ==
Formerly part of the Isère department, Genas was attached to the Rhône department in 1967.

== Population ==
Historical population
Year	Pop.	±% p.a.
1968	2,828	—
1975	4,710	+7.56%
1982	5,471	+2.16%
1990	9,316	+6.88%
1999	11,140	+2.01%
2007	11,531	+0.43%
2012	12,355	+1.39%
2017	12,734	+0.61%
2023	13,421	+0.88%
Source: INSEE

== Transportation ==
The town is served by Rhône public transport services.

== Twin towns ==
Genas is twinned with Ronshausen in Germany.

== See also ==
- Communes of the Rhône department
