= La Boisse =

Commune in Auvergne-Rhône-Alpes, France

- Commune
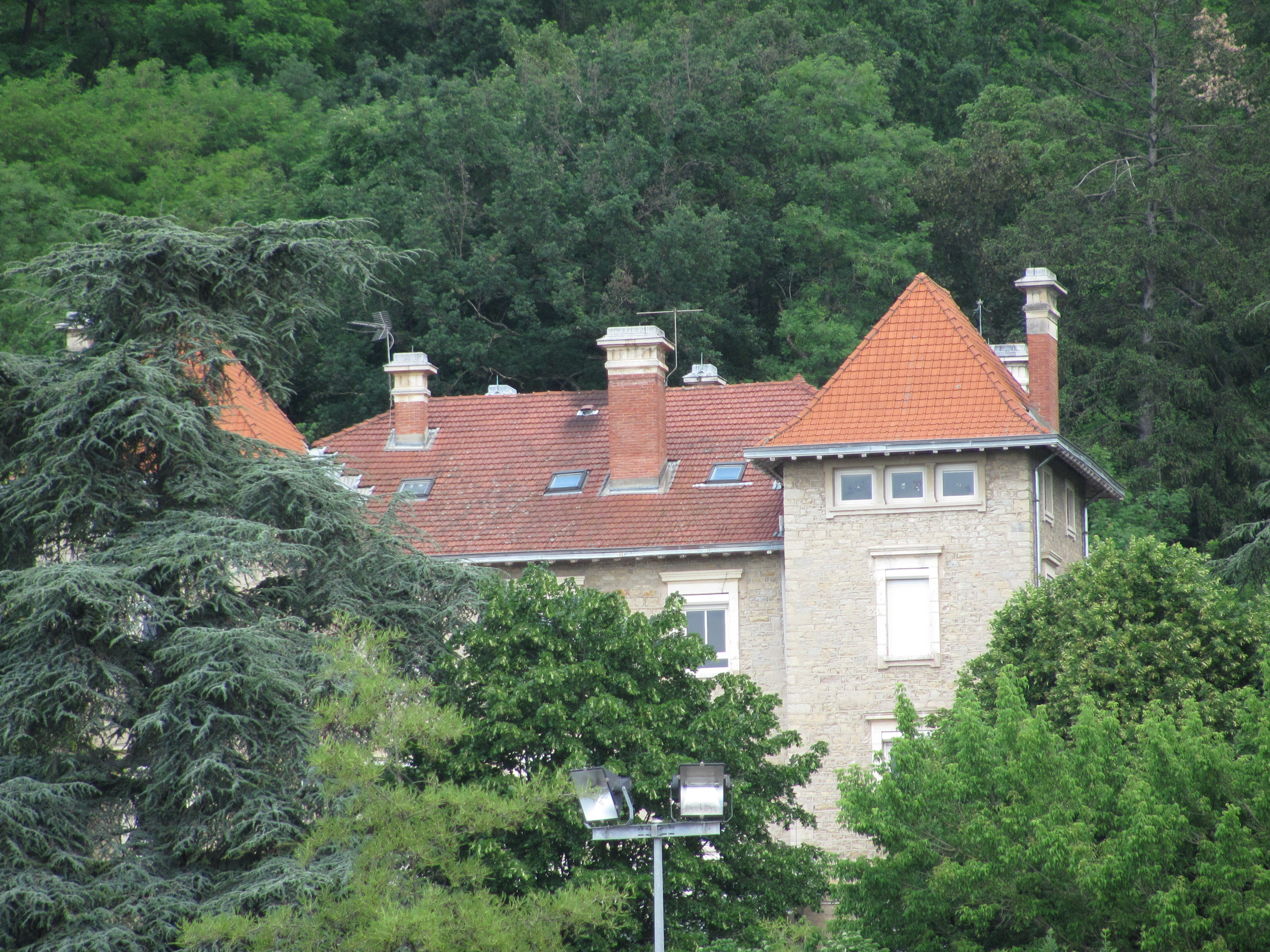
- Chateau of Grand-Casset

- Coat of arms
- Location of La Boisse
- Location within France Location within Auvergne-Rhône-Alpes
- Coordinates: 45°50′34″N 5°02′11″E
- Country: France
- Region: Auvergne-Rhône-Alpes
- Department: Ain
- Arrondissement: Bourg-en-Bresse
- Canton: Miribel
- Intercommunality: La Côtière à Montluel

Government
  - Mayor (2026–32): Laurent Soileux
- Area^{1}: 9.4 km^{2} (3.6 sq mi)
- Elevation: 240 m (790 ft)
- Highest elevation: 319 m (1,047 ft)
- Lowest elevation: 179 m (587 ft)
- Population (2023): 3,449
  - Density: 370/km^{2} (950/sq mi)
- Time zone: UTC+01:00 (CET)
  - Summer (DST): UTC+02:00 (CEST)
- INSEE/Postal code: 01049 /01120
- Website: https://www.ville-laboisse.fr/
- ^{1} French Land Register data, which excludes lakes, ponds, glaciers > 1 km^{2} (0.386 sq mi or 247 acres) and river estuaries.

La Boisse (French pronunciation: [la bwas]; Arpitan: La Bouesse) is a commune in the Ain department in central-eastern France.

== Population ==
Historical population
| Year | Pop. | ±% p.a. |
|---|---|---|
| 1968 | 1,457 | — |
| 1975 | 1,751 | +2.66% |
| 1982 | 1,959 | +1.62% |
| 1990 | 2,419 | +2.67% |
| 1999 | 2,709 | +1.27% |
| 2007 | 2,804 | +0.43% |
| 2012 | 2,903 | +0.70% |
| 2017 | 3,229 | +2.15% |
| 2023 | 3,449 | +1.10% |
Source: INSEE

== See also ==
- Communes of the Ain department
