= Saint-Laurent-de-Mure =

- Commune
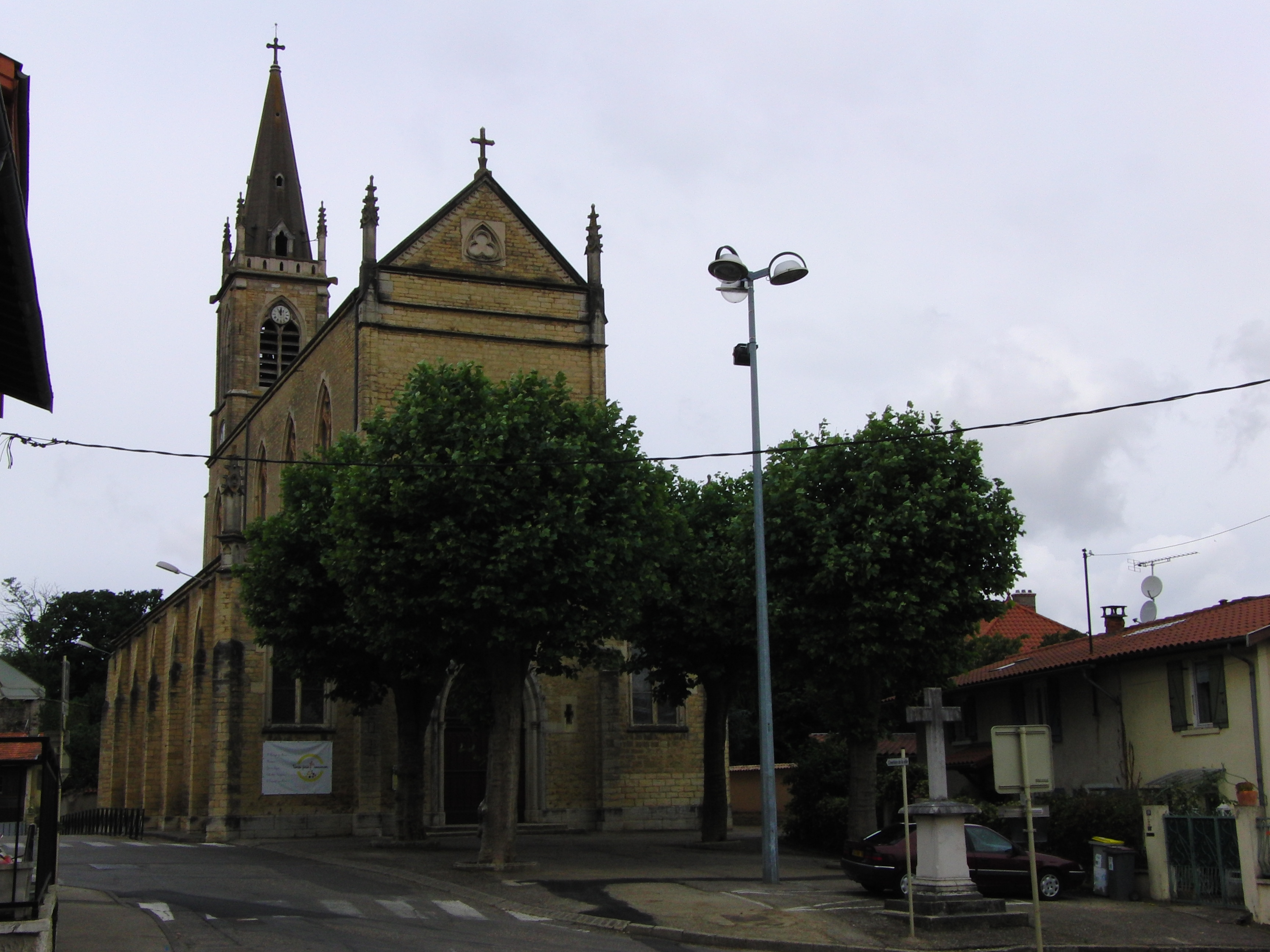
- Parish church in Saint-Laurent-de-Mure

- Coat of arms
- Location of Saint-Laurent-de-Mure
- Location within France Location within Auvergne-Rhône-Alpes
- Coordinates: 45°41′11″N 5°02′44″E
- Country: France
- Region: Auvergne-Rhône-Alpes
- Department: Rhône
- Arrondissement: Lyon
- Canton: Genas
- Intercommunality: CC de l'Est Lyonnais

Government
  - Mayor (2020–2026): Patrick Fiorini
- Area^{1}: 18.63 km^{2} (7.19 sq mi)
- Elevation: 252 m (827 ft)
- Highest elevation: 313 m (1,027 ft)
- Lowest elevation: 227 m (745 ft)
- Population (2023): 5,791
  - Density: 310.8/km^{2} (805.1/sq mi)
- Time zone: UTC+01:00 (CET)
  - Summer (DST): UTC+02:00 (CEST)
- INSEE/Postal code: 69288 /69720
- ^{1} French Land Register data, which excludes lakes, ponds, glaciers > 1 km^{2} (0.386 sq mi or 247 acres) and river estuaries.

Saint-Laurent-de-Mure (French pronunciation: [sɛ̃ loʁɑ̃ də myʁ]) is a commune in the Rhône department in eastern France. Saint-Laurent-de-Mure forms part of the communauté de communes (grouping of communes) in the eastern Lyon area which cooperate to provide improved services for inhabitants.

== Location ==
This small village lies 18 kilometres (11 mi) to the east of France's third largest city, Lyon. Within an easy commute of the city centre, on the first/last exit before the toll road (péage), it is also close to the international airport, Lyon-Saint Exupéry Airport.

== History ==
The town bears traces of occupation dating as far back as the Neolithic, as evidenced by the Recou Woods cupstone.

Ruins of a delphinal castle remain on the Escoffier farm, and its surrounding walls can be seen here and there in the old village.

The Château de Saint-Laurent was once owned by the barons of Jerphanion, Barons of the Empire whose descendants are among the best jewelers in France, located on the Rue de la République in Lyon.

The château has the peculiarity of having sewers at children's height, allowing those of the village to regularly enter. There are also ancient tombs in Saint-Laurent-de-Mure, at the place called Bois du Baron.

== Population ==
Historical population
Year	Pop.	±% p.a.
1968	1,527	—
1975	2,498	+7.28%
1982	3,336	+4.22%
1990	4,513	+3.85%
1999	4,694	+0.44%
2007	4,914	+0.57%
2012	5,326	+1.62%
2017	5,377	+0.19%
2023	5,791	+1.24%
Source: INSEE

== Renovation ==
Renovation work on the local manor house has created an example of the modern French approach and attitudes to the use of older properties. The front façade has been renovated rather than restored, and at the rear of the building a glass-walled extension has been added to allow for expansion. The house forms the focal point of the local woods, which are often used by the local junior school for the kermesse and other activities.

== Twin towns ==
Saint-Laurent-de-Mure is twinned with:

- Chambave, Italy

== See also ==
- Communes of the Rhône department
