= Communay =

- Commune
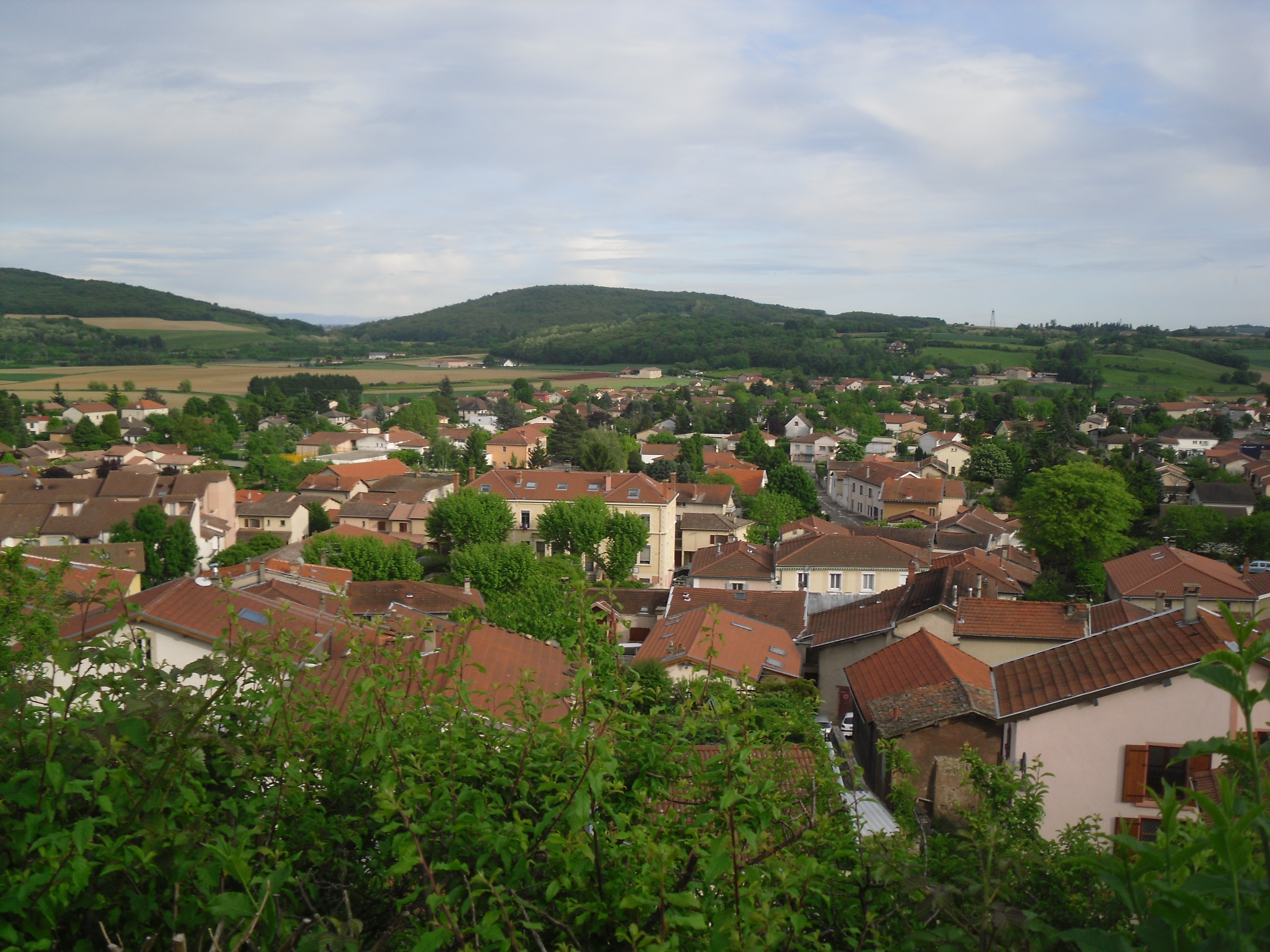
- A general view of Communay

- Coat of arms
- Location of Communay
- Location within France Location within Auvergne-Rhône-Alpes
- Coordinates: 45°36′19″N 4°50′08″E
- Country: France
- Region: Auvergne-Rhône-Alpes
- Department: Rhône
- Arrondissement: Lyon
- Canton: Saint-Symphorien-d'Ozon
- Intercommunality: Pays de l'Ozon

Government
  - Mayor (2020–2026): Jean-Philippe Choné
- Area^{1}: 10.54 km^{2} (4.07 sq mi)
- Elevation: 180 m (590 ft)
- Highest elevation: 359 m (1,178 ft)
- Lowest elevation: 210 m (690 ft)
- Population (2023): 4,540
  - Density: 431/km^{2} (1,120/sq mi)
- Time zone: UTC+01:00 (CET)
  - Summer (DST): UTC+02:00 (CEST)
- INSEE/Postal code: 69272 /69360
- ^{1} French Land Register data, which excludes lakes, ponds, glaciers > 1 km^{2} (0.386 sq mi or 247 acres) and river estuaries.

Communay (French pronunciation: [kɔmynɛ]) is a commune in the Rhône department in eastern France. It is around 15 km south of the centre of Lyon.

== Population ==
Historical population
Year	Pop.	±% p.a.
1968	1,247	—
1975	1,859	+5.87%
1982	2,356	+3.44%
1990	2,918	+2.71%
1999	3,883	+3.23%
2007	3,917	+0.11%
2012	4,080	+0.82%
2017	4,197	+0.57%
2023	4,540	+1.32%
Source: INSEE

== See also ==
- Communes of the Rhône department
