= Ternay, Rhône =

Ternay
- Commune
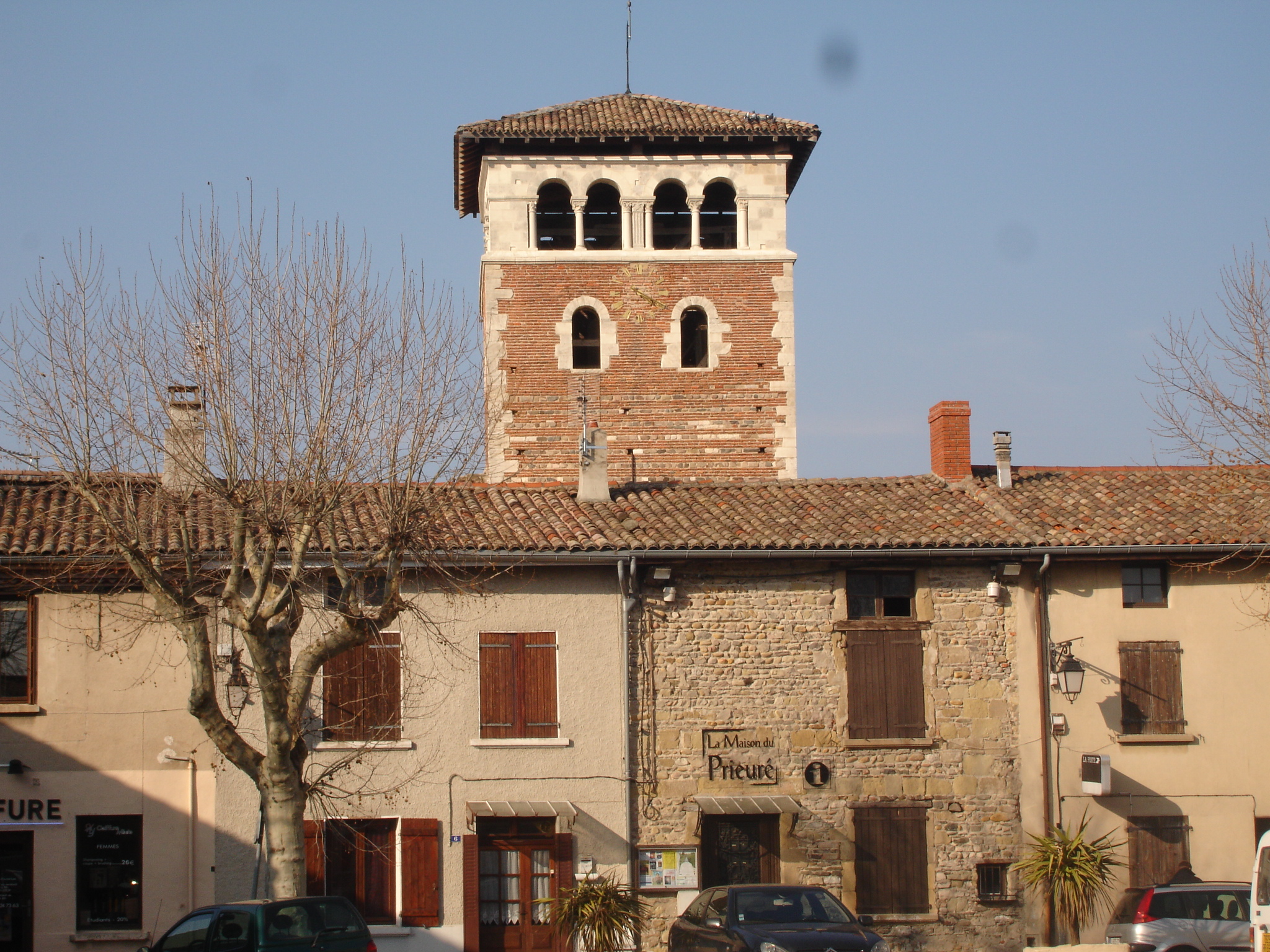
- The main square and the church tower

- Coat of arms
- Location of Ternay
- Location within France Location within Auvergne-Rhône-Alpes
- Coordinates: 45°36′11″N 4°48′41″E
- Country: France
- Region: Auvergne-Rhône-Alpes
- Department: Rhône
- Arrondissement: Lyon
- Canton: Saint-Symphorien-d'Ozon
- Intercommunality: Pays de l'Ozon

Government
  - Mayor (2020–2026): Mattia Scotti
- Area^{1}: 8.06 km^{2} (3.11 sq mi)
- Elevation: 208 m (682 ft)
- Highest elevation: 281 m (922 ft)
- Lowest elevation: 153 m (502 ft)
- Population (2023): 5,596
  - Density: 694/km^{2} (1,800/sq mi)
- Time zone: UTC+01:00 (CET)
  - Summer (DST): UTC+02:00 (CEST)
- INSEE/Postal code: 69297 /69360
- ^{1} French Land Register data, which excludes lakes, ponds, glaciers > 1 km^{2} (0.386 sq mi or 247 acres) and river estuaries.

Ternay (French pronunciation: [tɛʁnɛ]) is a commune in the Rhône department in eastern France.

== Population ==
Historical population
Year	Pop.	±% p.a.
1968	2,004	—
1975	2,708	+4.39%
1982	3,859	+5.19%
1990	4,085	+0.71%
1999	4,618	+1.37%
2007	5,018	+1.04%
2012	5,365	+1.35%
2017	5,514	+0.55%
2023	5,596	+0.25%
Source: INSEE

== See also ==
- Communes of the Rhône department
