= Saint-Bonnet-de-Mure =

- Commune
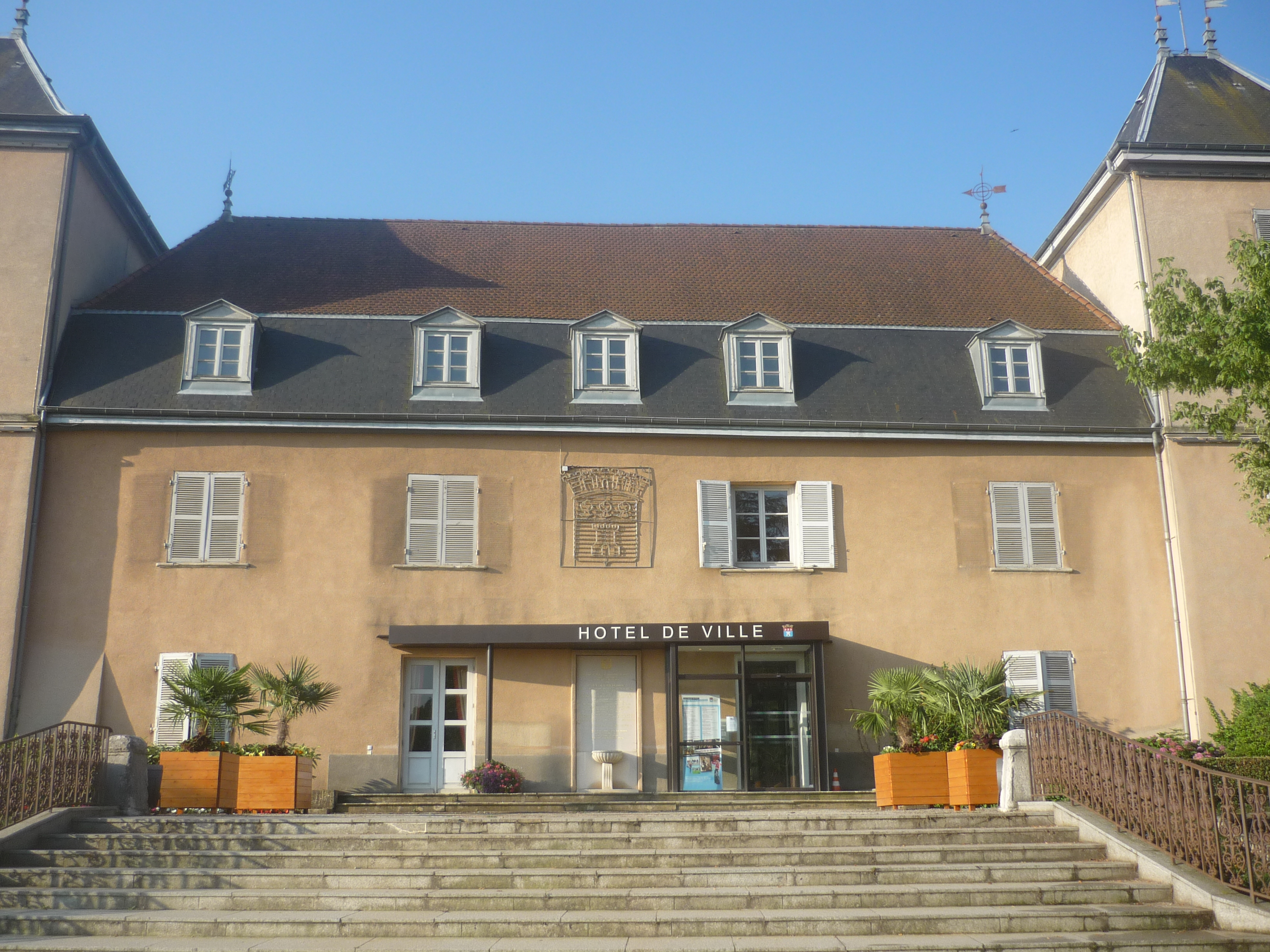
- The town hall in Saint-Bonnet-de-Mure

- Coat of arms
- Location of Saint-Bonnet-de-Mure
- Location within France Location within Auvergne-Rhône-Alpes
- Coordinates: 45°41′29″N 5°01′48″E
- Country: France
- Region: Auvergne-Rhône-Alpes
- Department: Rhône
- Arrondissement: Lyon
- Canton: Genas
- Intercommunality: l'Est Lyonnais

Government
  - Mayor (2020–2026): Jean-Pierre Jourdain
- Area^{1}: 16.34 km^{2} (6.31 sq mi)
- Highest elevation: 287 m (942 ft)
- Lowest elevation: 220 m (720 ft)
- Population (2023): 6,984
  - Density: 427.4/km^{2} (1,107/sq mi)
- Time zone: UTC+01:00 (CET)
  - Summer (DST): UTC+02:00 (CEST)
- INSEE/Postal code: 69287 /69720
- ^{1} French Land Register data, which excludes lakes, ponds, glaciers > 1 km^{2} (0.386 sq mi or 247 acres) and river estuaries.

Saint-Bonnet-de-Mure (Arpitan: Sant-Bônèt-de-Mures) is a commune in the Rhône department in eastern France.

== Population ==
Historical population
Year	Pop.	±% p.a.
1968	1,282	—
1975	2,363	+9.13%
1982	3,206	+4.45%
1990	4,604	+4.63%
1999	5,597	+2.19%
2007	6,090	+1.06%
2012	6,822	+2.30%
2017	6,800	−0.06%
2023	6,984	+0.45%
Source: INSEE

== See also ==
- Communes of the Rhône department
