= Pusignan =

- Commune
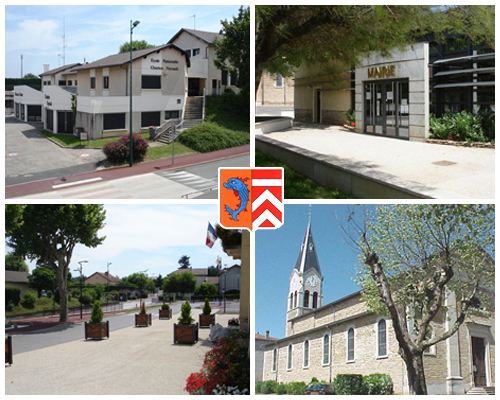
- Views of Pusignan, including the town hall and church

- Coat of arms
- Location of Pusignan
- Location within France Location within Auvergne-Rhône-Alpes
- Coordinates: 45°45′23″N 5°04′05″E
- Country: France
- Region: Auvergne-Rhône-Alpes
- Department: Rhône
- Arrondissement: Lyon
- Canton: Genas
- Intercommunality: l'Est Lyonnais

Government
  - Mayor (2021–2026): Anita Di Murro
- Area^{1}: 13.04 km^{2} (5.03 sq mi)
- Elevation: 220 m (720 ft)
- Highest elevation: 271 m (889 ft)
- Lowest elevation: 199 m (653 ft)
- Population (2023): 4,119
  - Density: 315.9/km^{2} (818.1/sq mi)
- Time zone: UTC+01:00 (CET)
  - Summer (DST): UTC+02:00 (CEST)
- INSEE/Postal code: 69285 /69330
- ^{1} French Land Register data, which excludes lakes, ponds, glaciers > 1 km^{2} (0.386 sq mi or 247 acres) and river estuaries.

Pusignan (French pronunciation: [pyziɲɑ̃]) is a commune in the Rhône department in eastern France.

== Population ==
Historical population
Year	Pop.	±% p.a.
1968	1,249	—
1975	1,800	+5.36%
1982	1,876	+0.59%
1990	2,720	+4.75%
1999	3,098	+1.46%
2007	3,482	+1.47%
2012	3,730	+1.39%
2017	4,114	+1.98%
2023	4,119	+0.02%
Source: INSEE

== See also ==
- Communes of the Rhône department
