= European route E611 =

Road in trans-European E-road network

E611

Route information
- Length: 58 km (36 mi)

Major junctions
- From: Lyon
- To: Pont-d'Ain

Location
- Countries: France

Highway system
- International E-road network; A Class; B Class

European route E 611 is a European B class road in France, connecting the cities Lyon and Pont-d'Ain.

== Route ==
- France
  - E15, E70, E711 Lyon
  - Pont-d'Ain
