= Coupe Icare =

French festival of free flight

Coupe Icare, also known as the Icarus Cup, is an annual festival of free flight held between Saint-Hilaire (on the border of Chartreuse Mountains) and Lumbin (in the valley of Isère in France). The festival typically lasts four days and is held in the early autumn. Coupe Icare is best known for its Concours de déguisements (Masquerade Flight contest), in which paraglider and hang glider pilots fly in costume to compete for prizes.

Coupe Icare features aerial acrobatics, hang gliders, paragliders, and hot air balloons. In addition to flight competitions, live entertainment, and street performances, the festival offers children's activities and a flight museum. It is held in conjunction with a commercial exposition and a film festival.

Originally organized by Tourist Office of St Hilaire in 1974, it is now organized by Icare Festival Organisation (IFO), a non-profit founded in 1989 for the purpose of managing Coupe Icare.

The 2012 Coupe Icare was held on September 20–23.

== Pictures ==
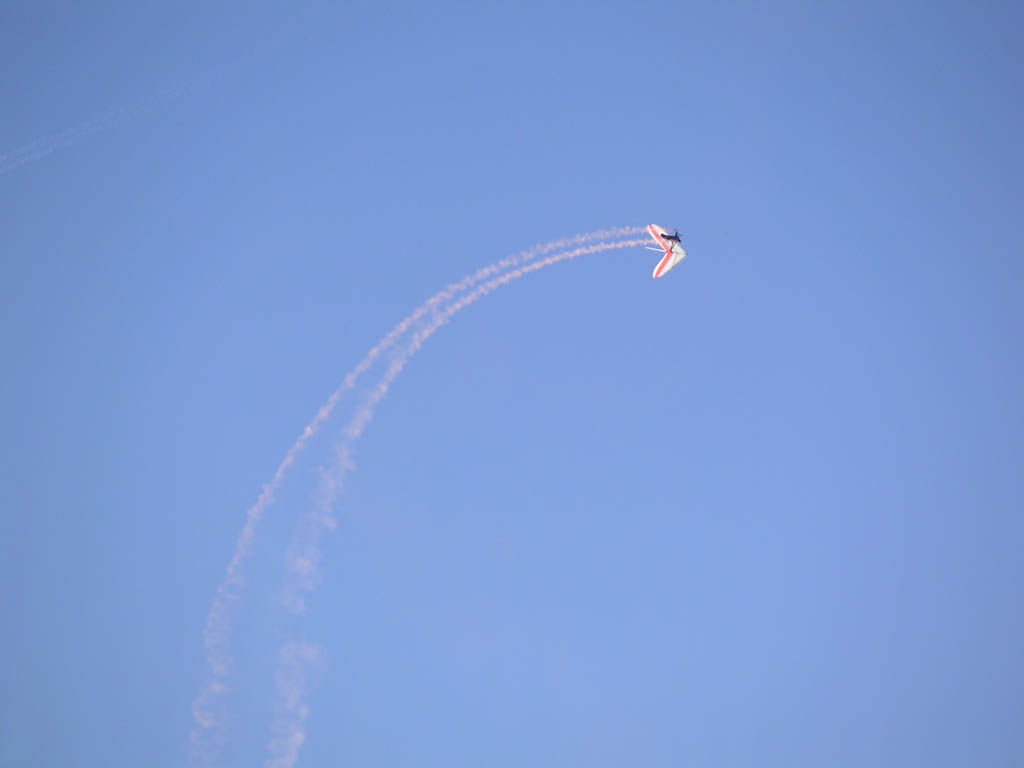
High velocity hang-glider

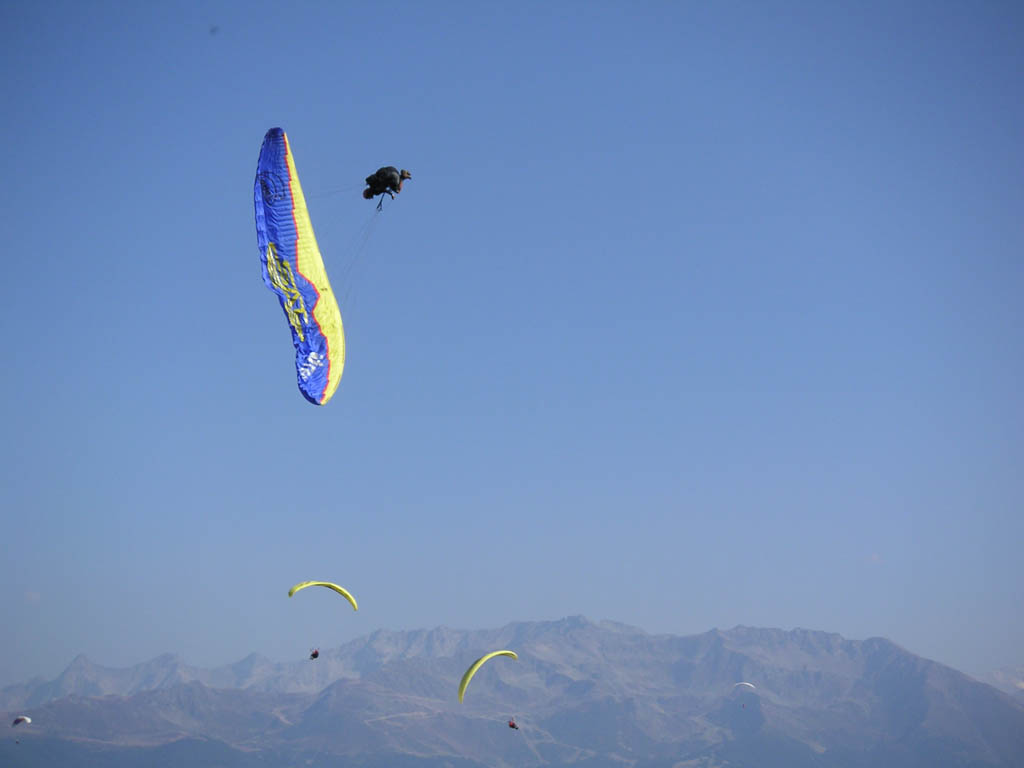
paragliding acrobatics

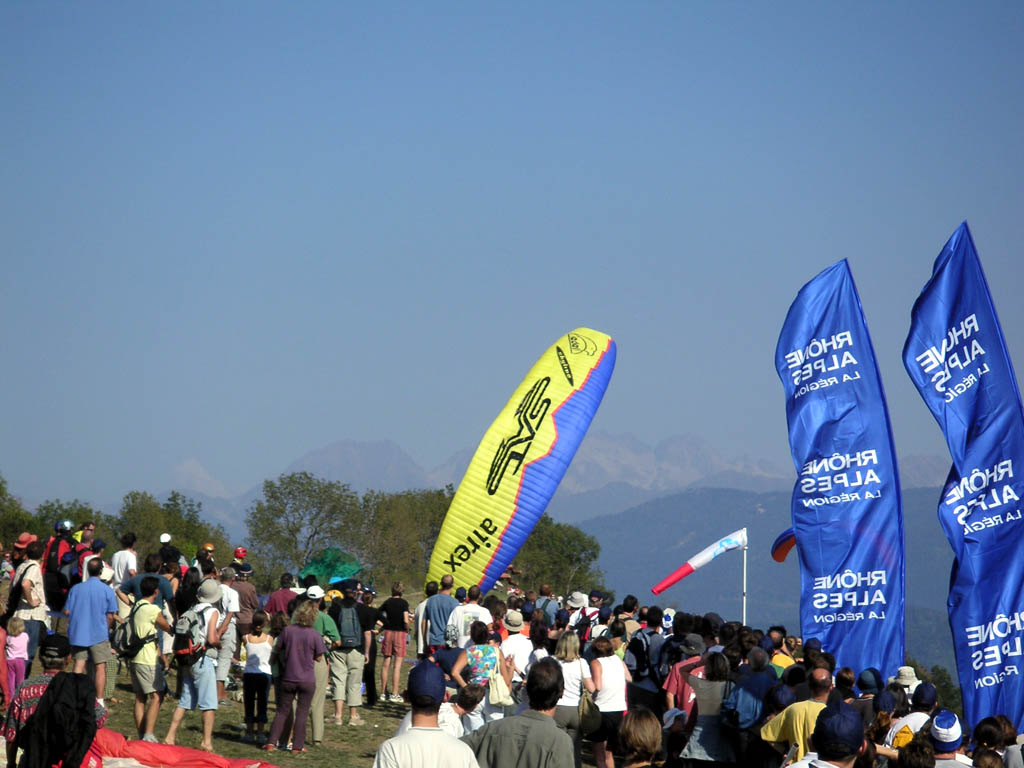
paragliding acrobatics #2

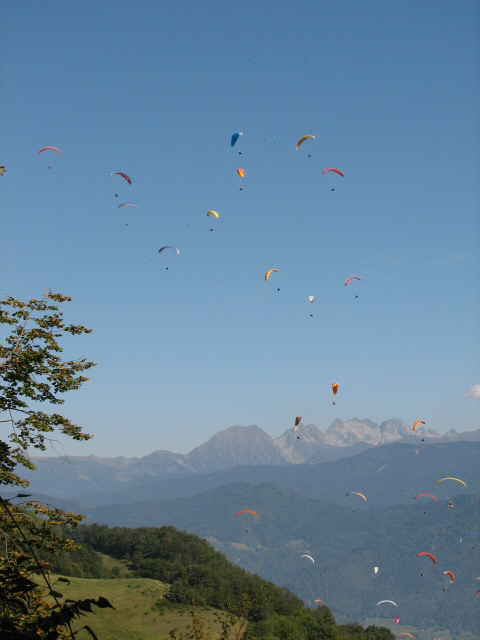
Much paragliding in the sky

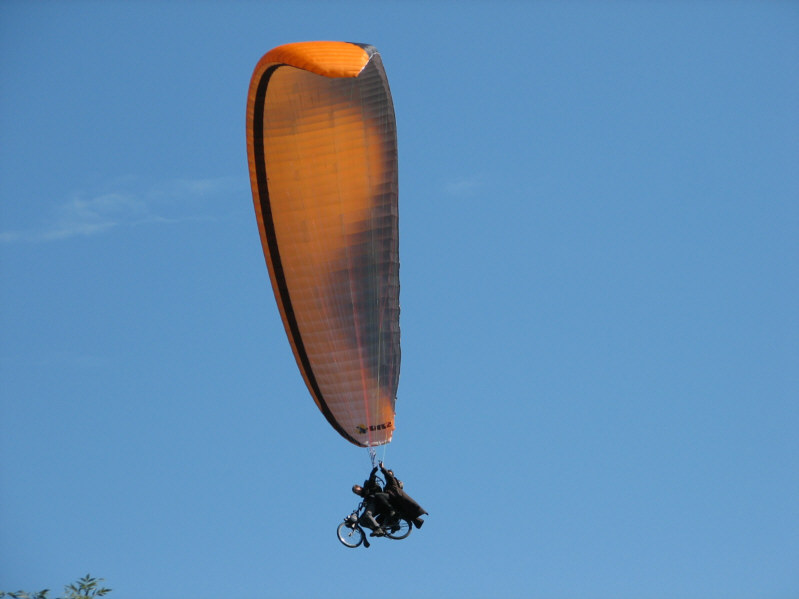
costume contest

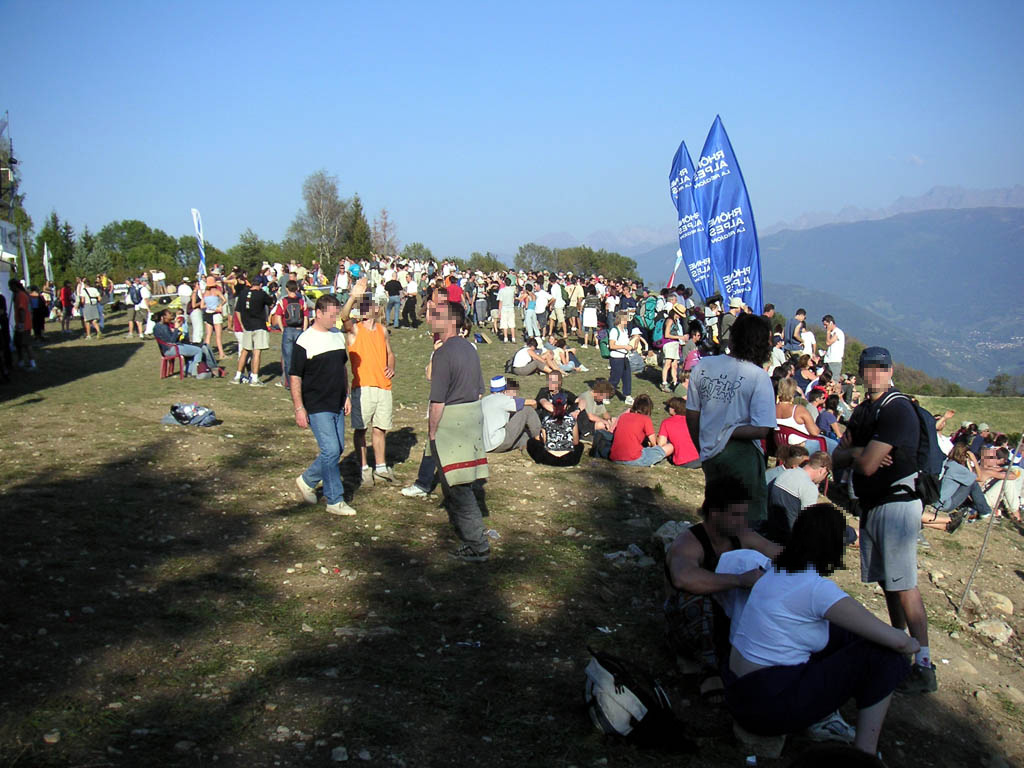
Take-off area, public side
