= Saint-Hilaire, Isère =

Saint-Hilaire
- Part of Plateau-des-Petites-Roches
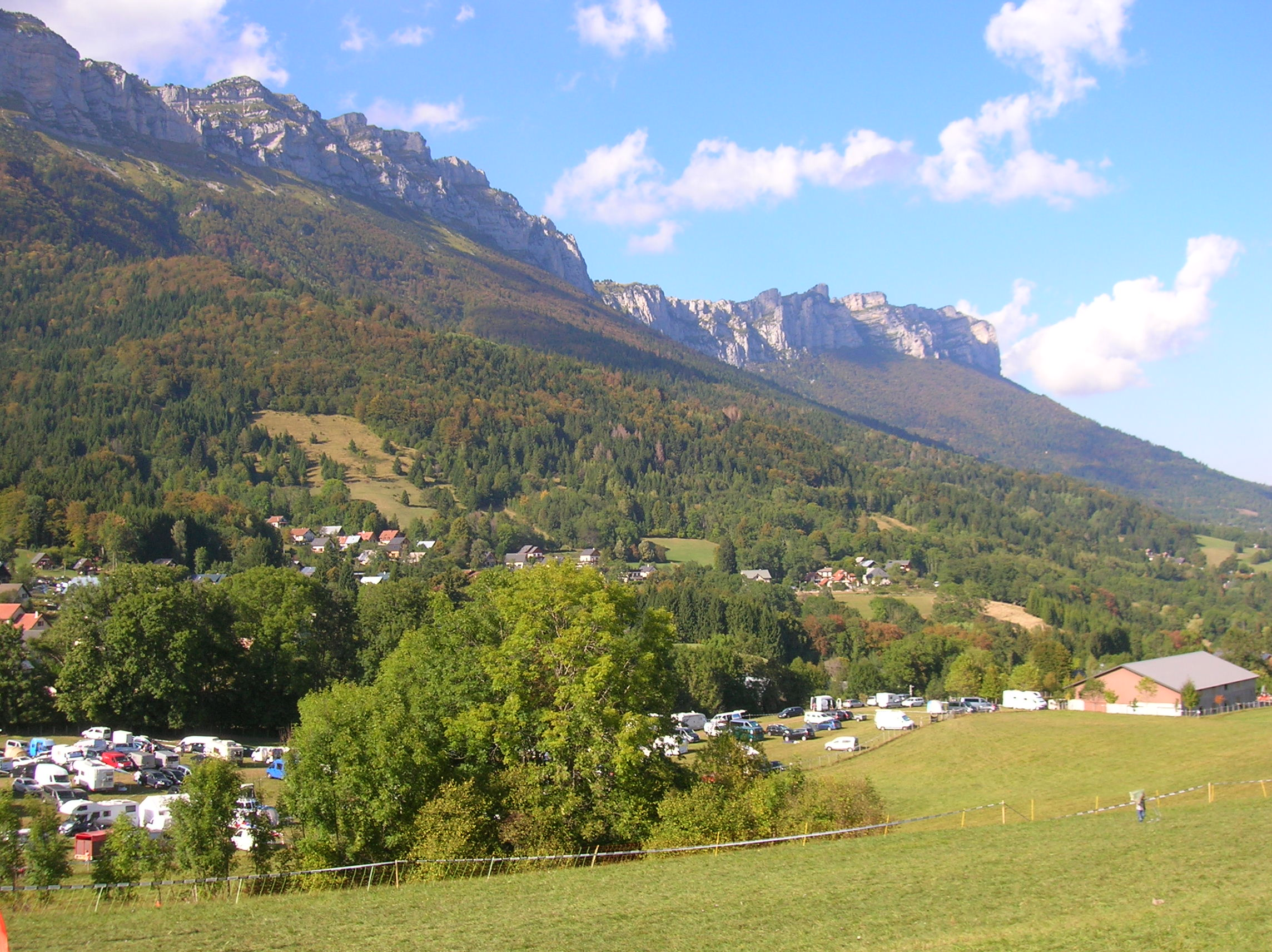
- A view of Saint-Hilaire

- Coat of arms
- Location of Saint-Hilaire
- Location within France Location within Auvergne-Rhône-Alpes
- Coordinates: 45°18′37″N 5°53′16″E
- Country: France
- Region: Auvergne-Rhône-Alpes
- Department: Isère
- Arrondissement: Grenoble
- Canton: Le Moyen Grésivaudan
- Commune: Plateau-des-Petites-Roches
- Area^{1}: 8.61 km^{2} (3.32 sq mi)
- Elevation: 1,000 m (3,300 ft)
- Highest elevation: 2,060 m (6,760 ft)
- Lowest elevation: 647 m (2,123 ft)
- Population (2023): 1,292
  - Density: 150/km^{2} (389/sq mi)
- Time zone: UTC+01:00 (CET)
  - Summer (DST): UTC+02:00 (CEST)
- Postal code: 38660
- ^{1} French Land Register data, which excludes lakes, ponds, glaciers > 1 km^{2} (0.386 sq mi or 247 acres) and river estuaries.

Saint-Hilaire, also known as Saint-Hilaire-du-Touvet (French pronunciation: [sɛ̃t‿ilɛːʁ dy tuvɛ]), is a former commune in the Isère department in the Auvergne-Rhône-Alpes region in Southeastern France.

On 1 January 2019, Saint-Hilaire was merged into the new commune of Plateau-des-Petites-Roches, alongside Saint-Bernard and Saint-Pancrasse. The commune was made up of the three smaller settlements of Saint-Hilaire, Les Margains and Les Gaudes; its town hall became that of the new commune. Its inhabitants are known in French as the Saint-Hilairois (masculine) and Saint-Hilairoises (feminine).

It is situated on the Plateau des Petites Roches, a natural balcony above the valley of the Isère, on the east side of the Massif de la Chartreuse and overlooked by the peak of the Dent de Crolles.

== Funicular ==
The settlement of Saint-Hilaire is linked to Montfort, situated on the road between Grenoble and Chambéry in the valley below, by the Funiculaire de Saint-Hilaire du Touvet. Until this was opened in 1924, the commune was accessible only on foot, or by mule. The funicular was constructed principally to serve several sanatoriums built at the same time to house tuberculosis patients. A road and bus line have long since been opened. On 29 December 2021, violent rainfall on water-saturated soil combined with rapid melting of the snowpack caused the Montfort stream to overflow its banks, seriously damaging the tracks and the funicular's downstream station, which were covered with several meters of gravel. As a result, the Funiculaire de Saint-Hilaire du Touvet was closed.

== Demographics ==
Historical population

Year	Pop.	±% p.a.
1793	518	—
1821	404	−0.88%
1846	421	+0.17%
1872	403	−0.17%
1901	271	−1.36%
1926	313	+0.58%
1931	618	+14.57%
1936	1,741	+23.02%
1946	2,188	+2.31%

Year	Pop.	±% p.a.
1962	1,307	−3.17%
1968	987	−4.57%
1975	1,131	+1.96%
1982	1,298	+1.99%
1990	1,423	+1.16%
1999	1,248	−1.45%
2010	1,532	+1.88%
2015	1,348	−2.53%
2023	1,292	−0.53%

Source: EHESS and INSEE (2010-2023)

== See also ==
- Communes of the Isère department
