= Funiculaire de Saint-Hilaire du Touvet =

Coordinates: 45°18′11.78″N 5°53′43.93″E

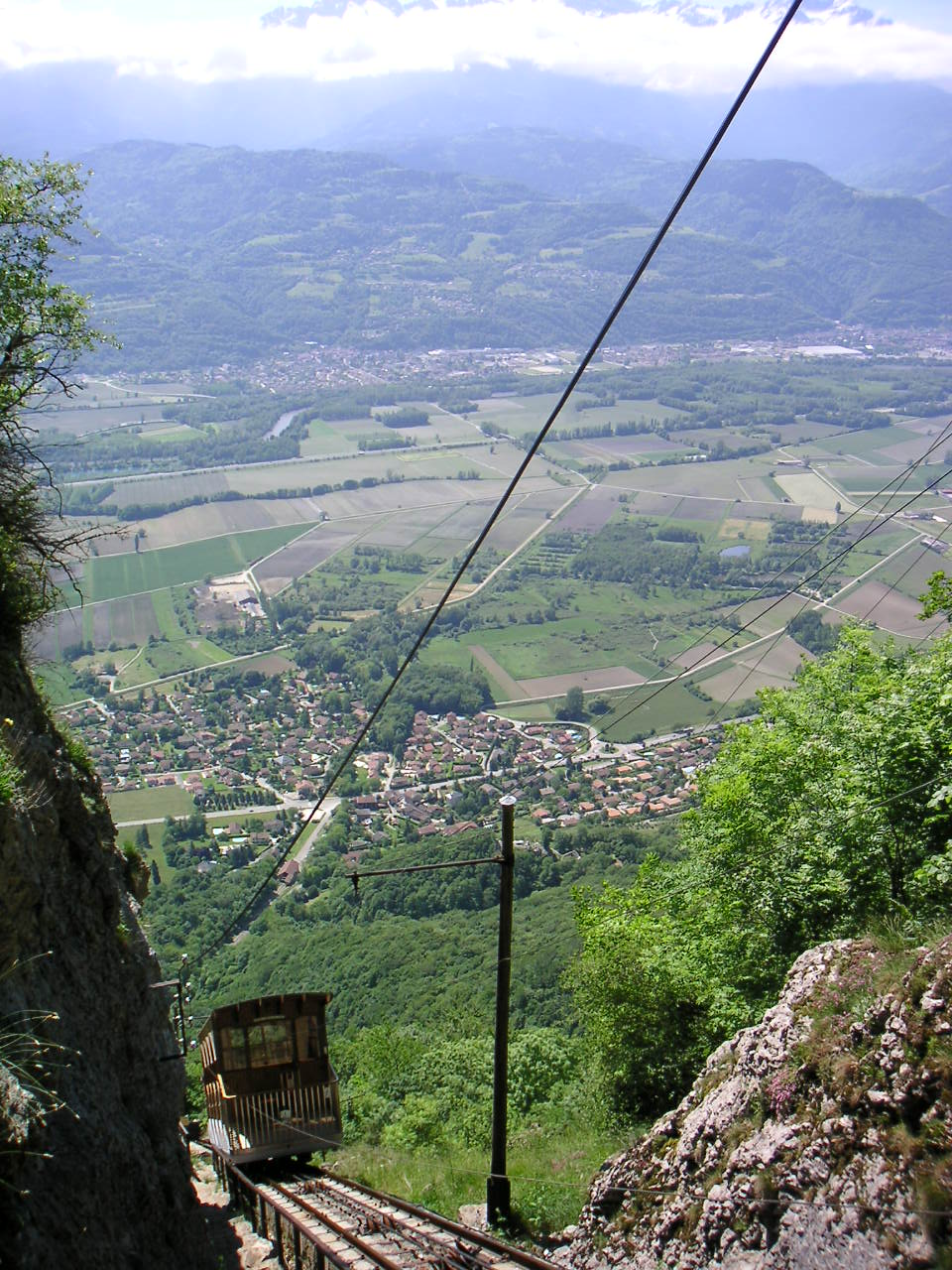

Overview
- Status: Operational
- Locale: Isère, France
- Termini: Montfort; Saint-Hilaire du Touvet

Service
- Type: Funicular

History
- Opened: 1924

Technical
- Line length: 1,480 m (4,860 ft)
- Track gauge: 1,000 mm (3 ft 3 3/8 in) metre gauge
- Maximum incline: 830 ‰ (83%)

The Funiculaire de Saint-Hilaire du Touvet, or Saint-Hilaire du Touvet Funicular, is a funicular railway in the Isère department in the Auvergne-Rhône-Alpes region of France. It connects Montfort, located on the road between Grenoble and Chambéry, to the village of Saint-Hilaire du Touvet, which is situated on the Plateau-des-Petites-Roches 600 metres (1,969 ft) above.

Before the construction of the funicular, Saint-Hilaire du Touvet was accessible only on foot or by mule. Work on the funicular began in 1920, and it opened in 1924, primarily to serve several sanatoria built to house tuberculosis patients. A road was later built, and today, the funicular is mainly used by tourists and paragliders.

Until 1955, the funicular operated with two 40-passenger cars. These were replaced that year by a more modern design, increasing capacity to 60 passengers per car. In 1992, these were replaced with new cars featuring a retro design reminiscent of the original 1924 models.

== See also ==
- List of funicular railways
