= Saint-Bernard, Isère =

Saint-Bernard
- Part of Plateau-des-Petites-Roches
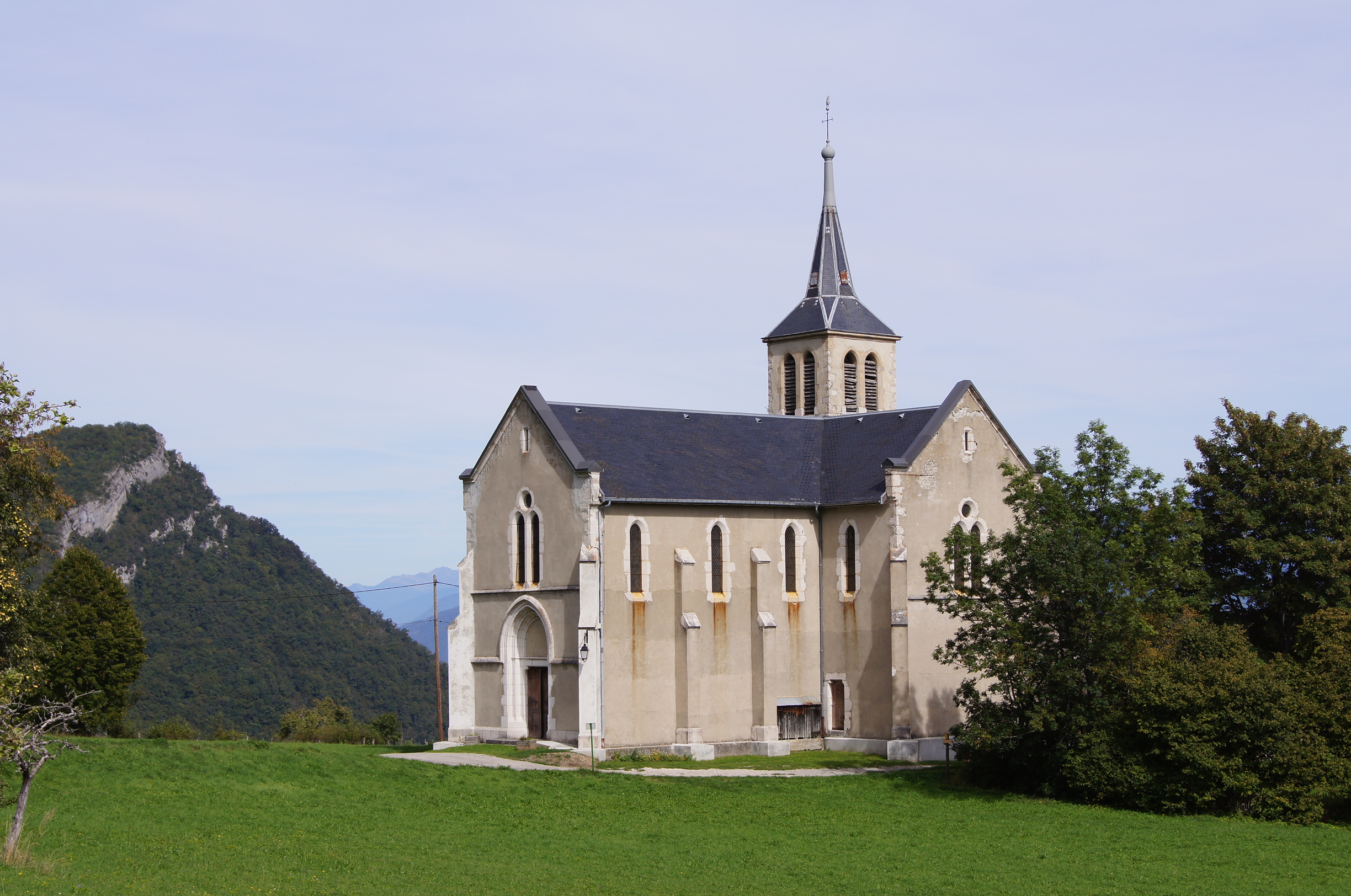
- The church of Saint-Bernard

- Coat of arms
- Location of Saint-Bernard
- Location within France Location within Auvergne-Rhône-Alpes
- Coordinates: 45°19′48″N 5°54′14″E
- Country: France
- Region: Auvergne-Rhône-Alpes
- Department: Isère
- Arrondissement: Grenoble
- Canton: Le Moyen Grésivaudan
- Commune: Plateau-des-Petites-Roches
- Area^{1}: 21.6 km^{2} (8.3 sq mi)
- Elevation: 890 m (2,920 ft)
- Highest elevation: 2,047 m (6,716 ft)
- Lowest elevation: 593 m (1,946 ft)
- Population (2023): 687
  - Density: 31.8/km^{2} (82.4/sq mi)
- Time zone: UTC+01:00 (CET)
  - Summer (DST): UTC+02:00 (CEST)
- Postal code: 38660
- ^{1} French Land Register data, which excludes lakes, ponds, glaciers > 1 km^{2} (0.386 sq mi or 247 acres) and river estuaries.

Saint-Bernard, also known as Saint-Bernard-du-Touvet (French pronunciation: [sɛ̃ bɛʁnaʁ dy tuvɛ]), is a former commune in the Isère department in the Auvergne-Rhône-Alpes region in Southeastern France.

On 1 January 2019, Saint-Bernard was merged into the new commune of Plateau-des-Petites-Roches alongside Saint-Hilaire and Saint-Pancrasse, and became a commune déléguée ("delegated commune").

== Demographics ==
Historical population

Year	Pop.	±% p.a.
1793	281	—
1821	333	+0.61%
1846	432	+1.05%
1872	509	+0.63%
1901	360	−1.19%
1926	229	−1.79%
1946	168	−1.54%
1962	93	−3.63%
1968	92	−0.18%

Year	Pop.	±% p.a.
1975	137	+5.85%
1982	233	+7.88%
1990	359	+5.55%
1999	468	+2.99%
2006	569	+2.83%
2010	632	+2.66%
2015	623	−0.29%
2023	687	+1.23%

Source: EHESS and INSEE (2010-2023)

== See also ==
- Communes of the Isère department
