= Dent de Crolles =

Mountain in France

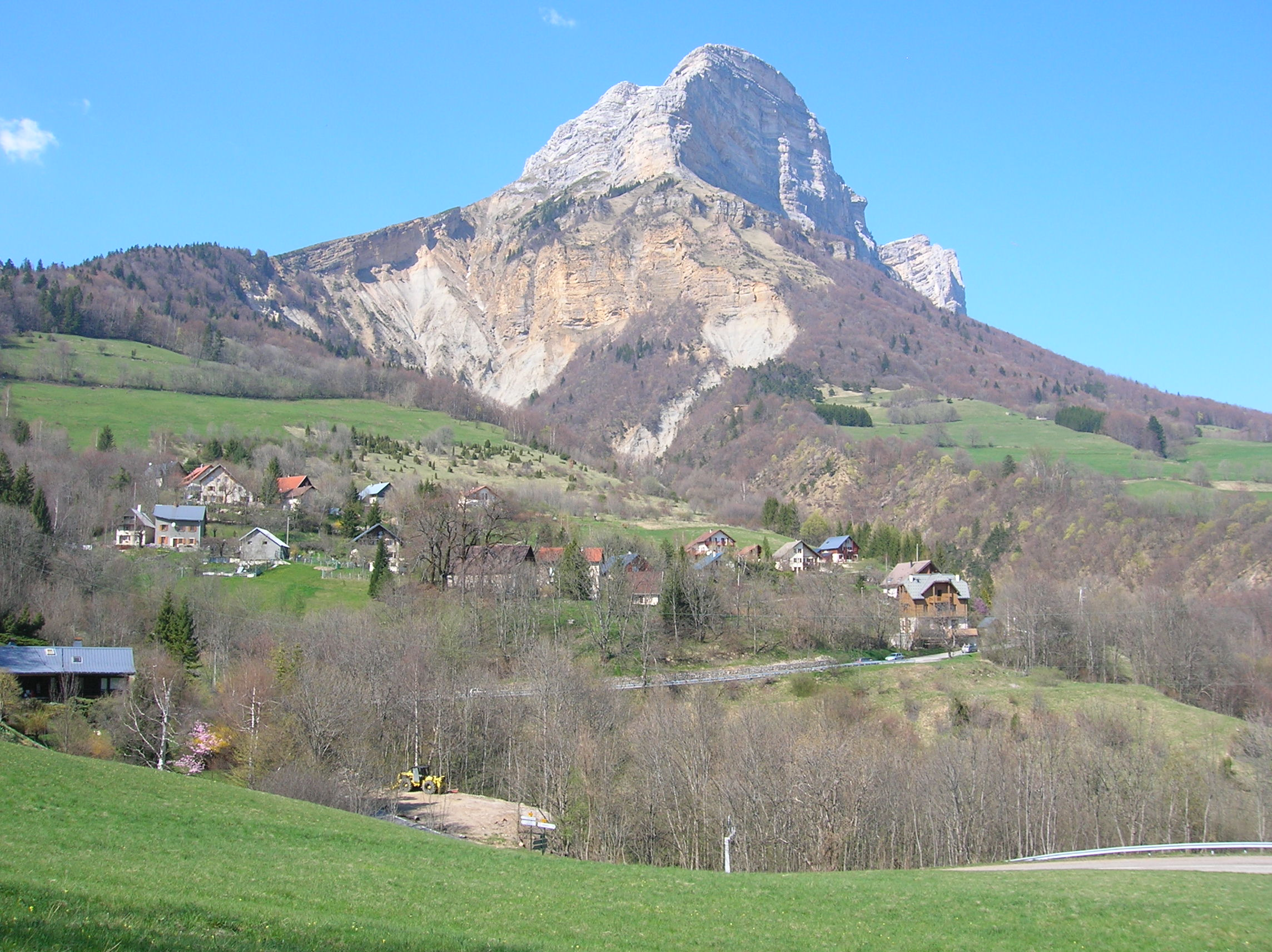
- The Dent de Crolles seen from Saint-Pancrasse (South)

Highest point
- Elevation: 2,062 m (6,765 ft)
- Prominence: 681 m (2,234 ft)
- Coordinates: 45°18′30″N 5°51′19″E

Geography
- Location within Alps Location within France
- Country: France
- Department: Isère
- Parent range: Chartreuse Mountains

Climbing
- Easiest route: From the Col du Coq

The Dent de Crolles (French pronunciation: [dɑ̃ də kʁol]) is a karstic mountain (2,062 m) of the Chartreuse Mountains range, 17 kilometres (11 miles) north east of Grenoble, Isère, France. The mountain has a characteristic "tooth-like" profile; the French word dent means "tooth". de Crolles is derived from the town of Crolles, located next to the peak. The Dent de Crolles is easily recognizable from the Isère Valley (Grésivaudan) near Grenoble.

== Geography ==
The Dent de Crolles is a karstic mountain (2,062 m) of the Chartreuse Mountains range, 17 kilometres (11 miles) north east of Grenoble, Isère, France. The French word "dent" means tooth and "de Crolles" is derived from the town of Crolles, located next to the mountain. It is easily recognizable from the Isère valley (Grésivaudan) in the Grenoble area.

== Cave system ==
The réseau de la Dent de Crolles, which lies beneath the summit plateau, is one of the most complex and longest cave systems in Europe, and is considered to be one of the birth places of modern caving. Its first detailed exploration was during World War II by a small team of French cavers which included Pierre Chevalier, Fernand Petzl, and Charles Petit-Didier. Their explorations saw it become the deepest cave in the world at the time with a depth of −658 m (−2,159 ft). The lack of available equipment during the war forced the team to develop their own equipment, leading to technical innovation. The first use of the single rope technique with prusik and mechanical rope-ascenders (Henri Brenot's "monkeys", first used by Chevalier and Brenot in a cave in 1934) can be directly associated with its exploration.

Since 1946, the cave has undergone intense and continuous exploration. As of 2023, eighteen separate entrances have been discovered. The highest is the Gouffre Bob Vouay at an altitude of 2,015 metres (6,611 ft) located close to the summit, and the lowest is the main resurgence, the Grotte du Guiers Mort at an altitude of 1,334 metres (4,377 ft), giving a depth of 681 metres (2,234 ft). It is known to include more than 60 kilometres (37 mi) of passages. The cave system is popular for the various through trips that the various entrances allow.

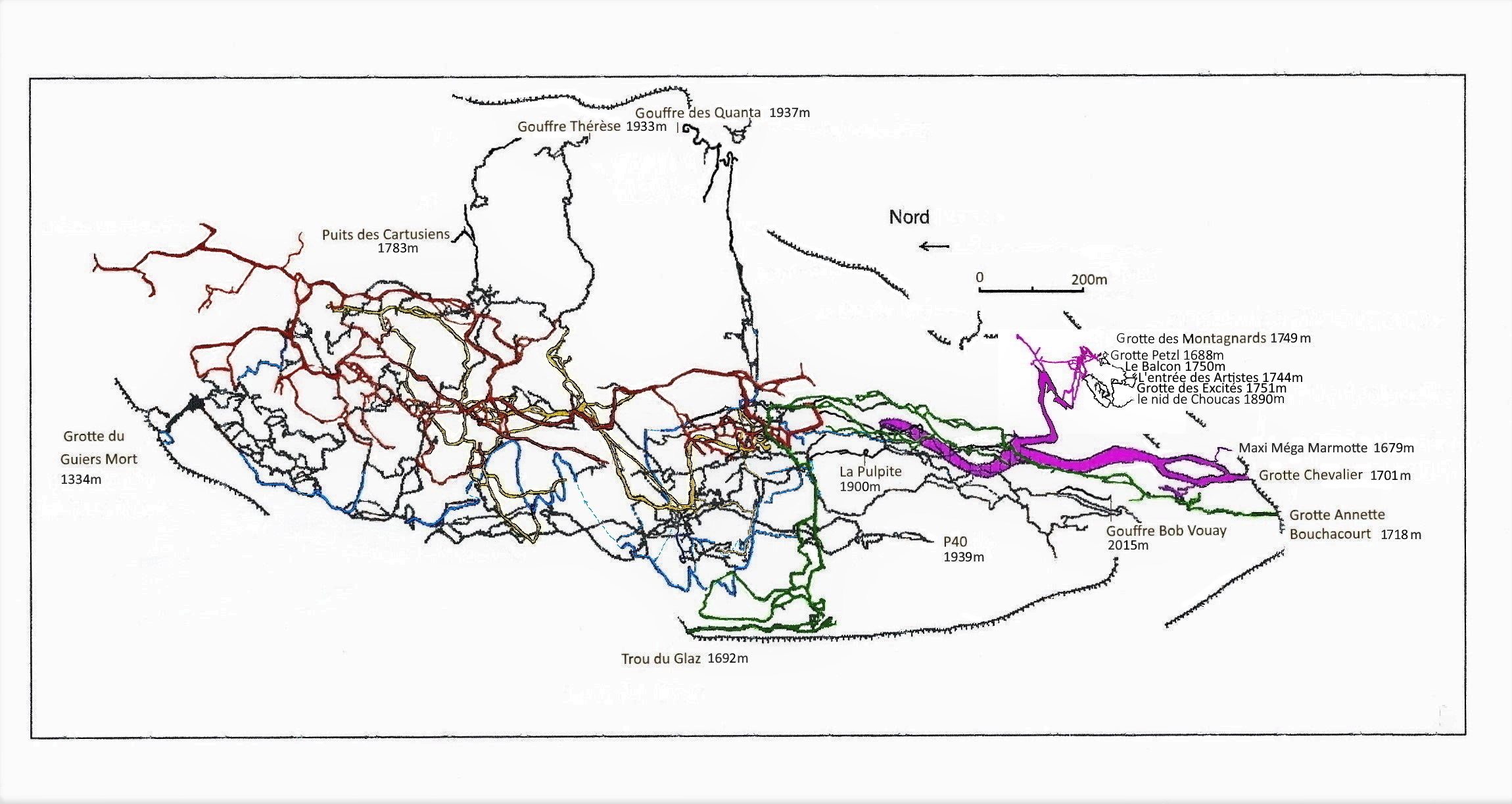
Schematic plan of the cave system of the Dent de Crolles. The colours correspond to different levels, the Grotte du Guiers Mort being the point 0; the blue represents the river : level 0 à +100 m; the yellow (le Métro) the level +100 à +140 m; the red (le boulevard des Tritons) the level +140 à +200 m; the green (Glaz-Annette) the level +350 m. The elevation between the highest entrance, the Gouffre Bob Vouay (2015 m), and the Grotte du Guiers Mort is 681 meters.

== Gallery ==
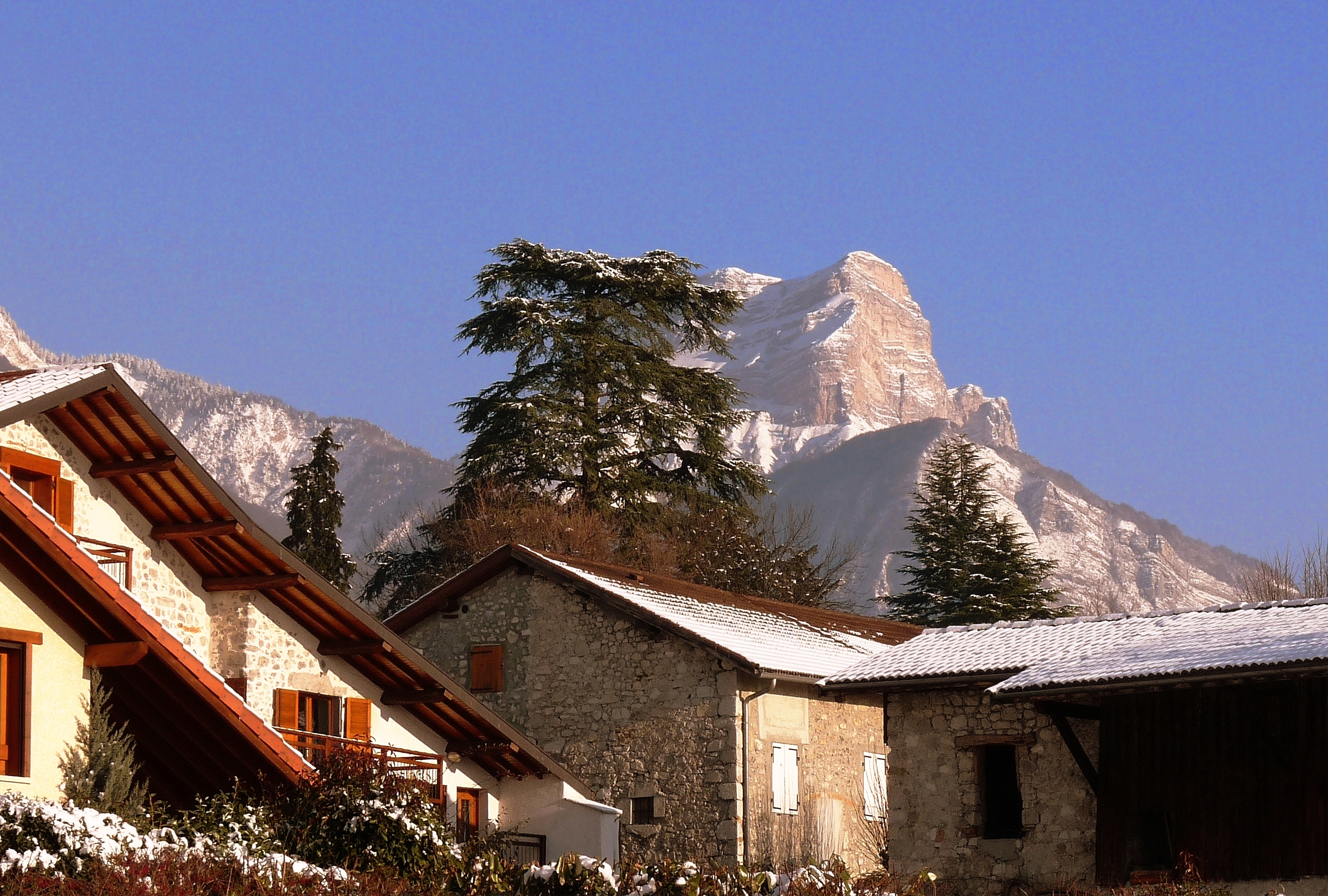
Dent de Crolles shot from Biviers.

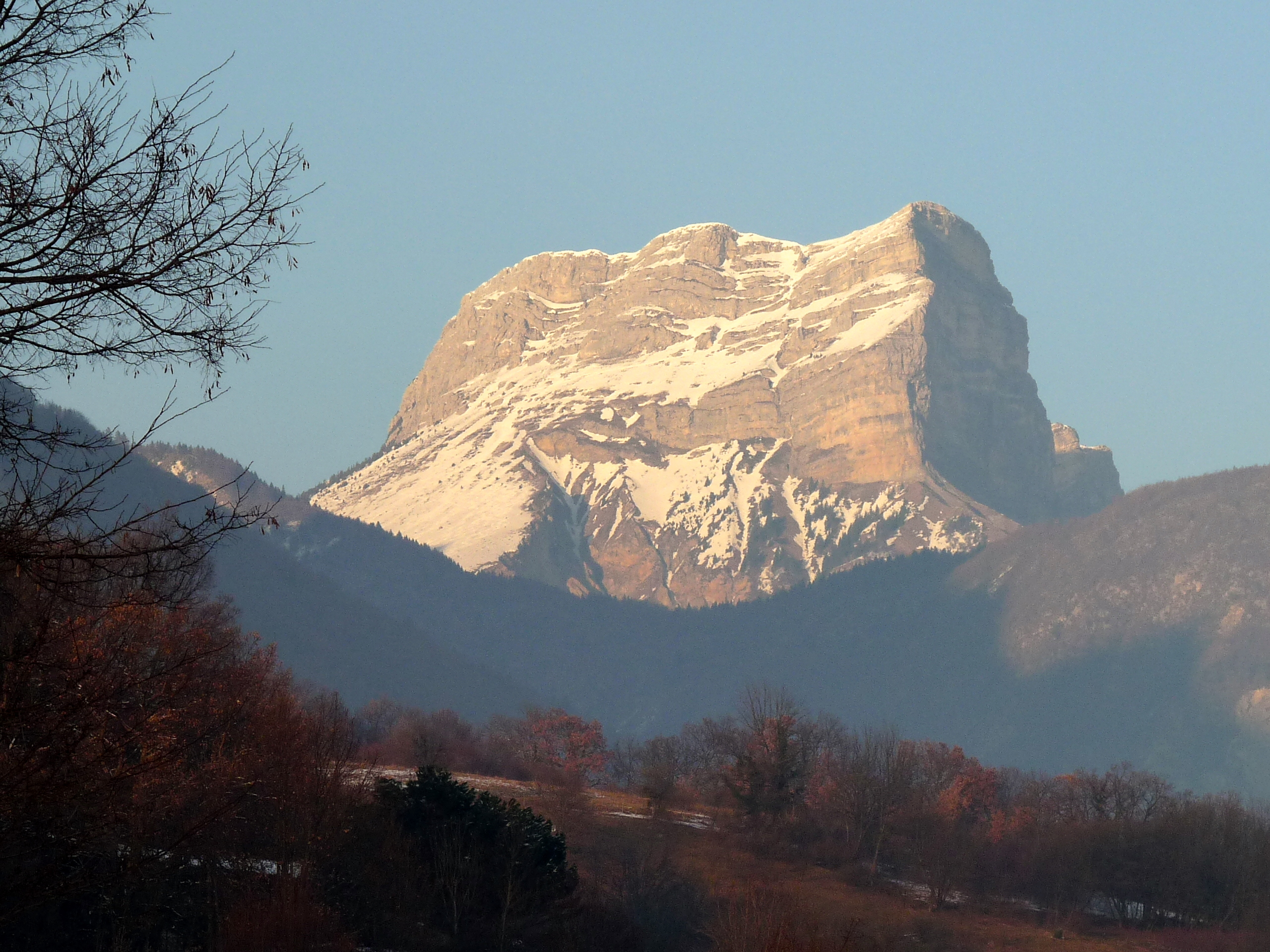
Dent de Crolles taken from Biviers.

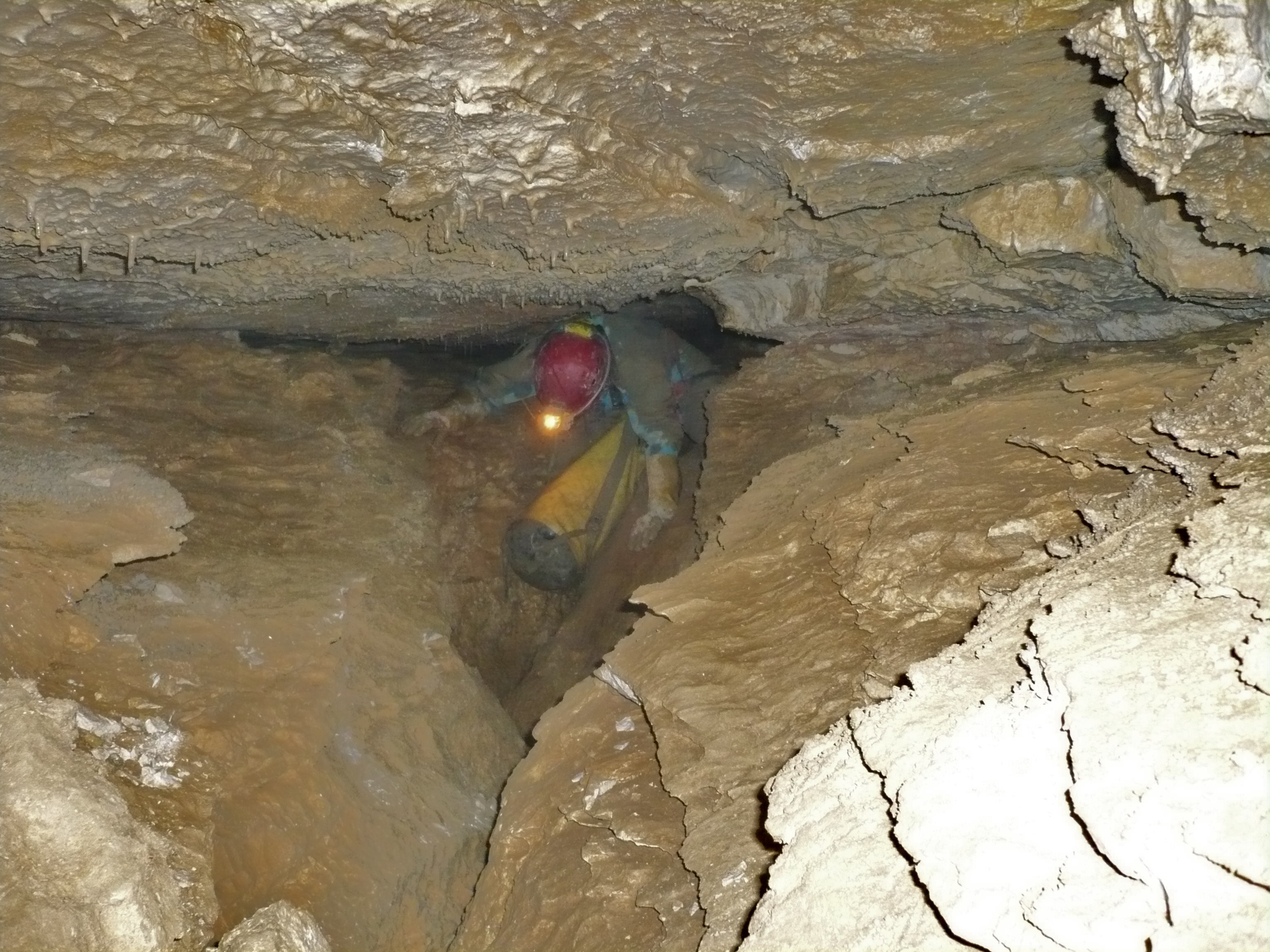
A passage in the Gouffre Bob Vouay - Grotte Chevalier traverse.

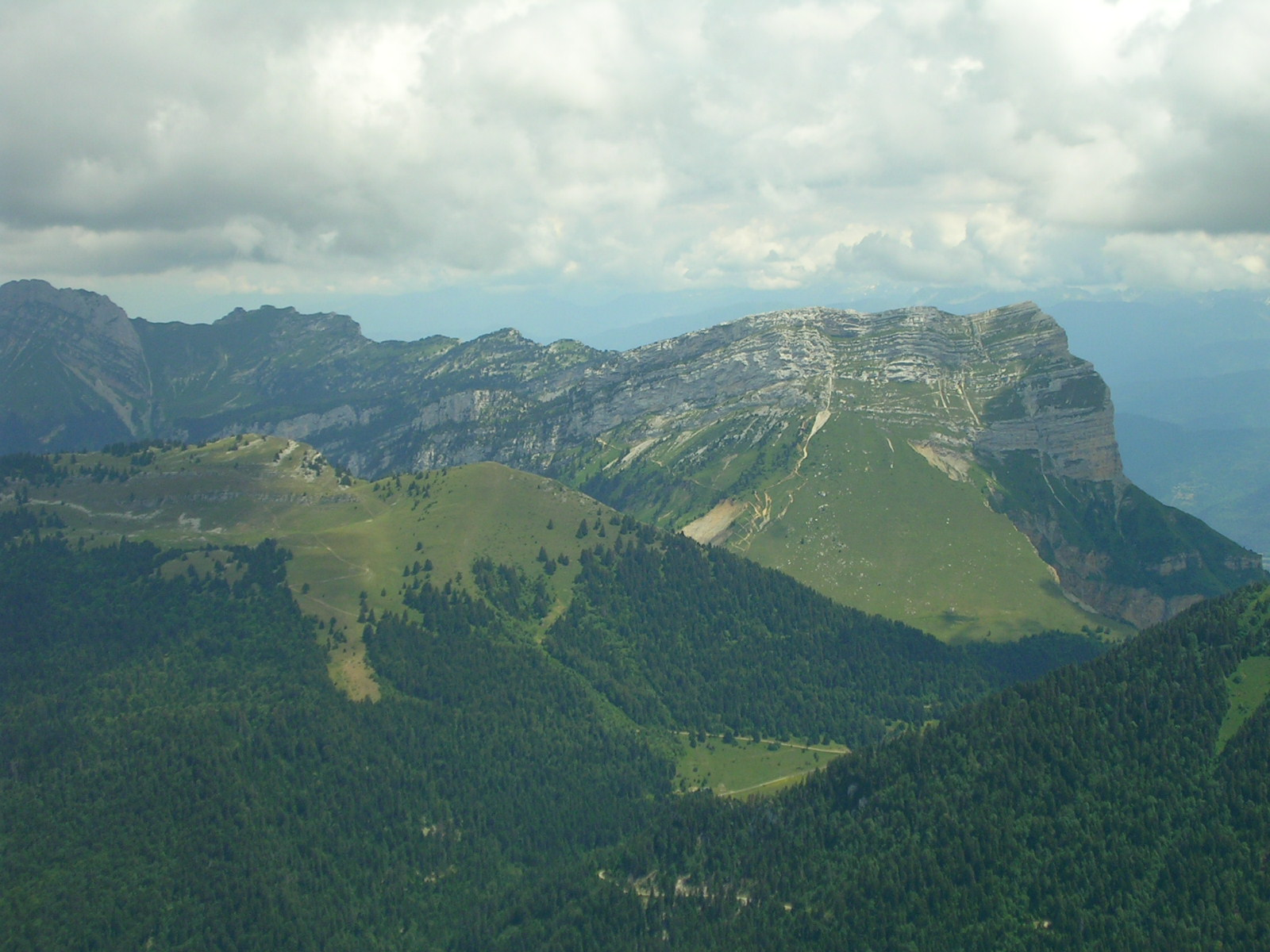
The Dent de Crolles taken from the summit of Chamechaude (south-west).

Map of the Dent de Crolles.

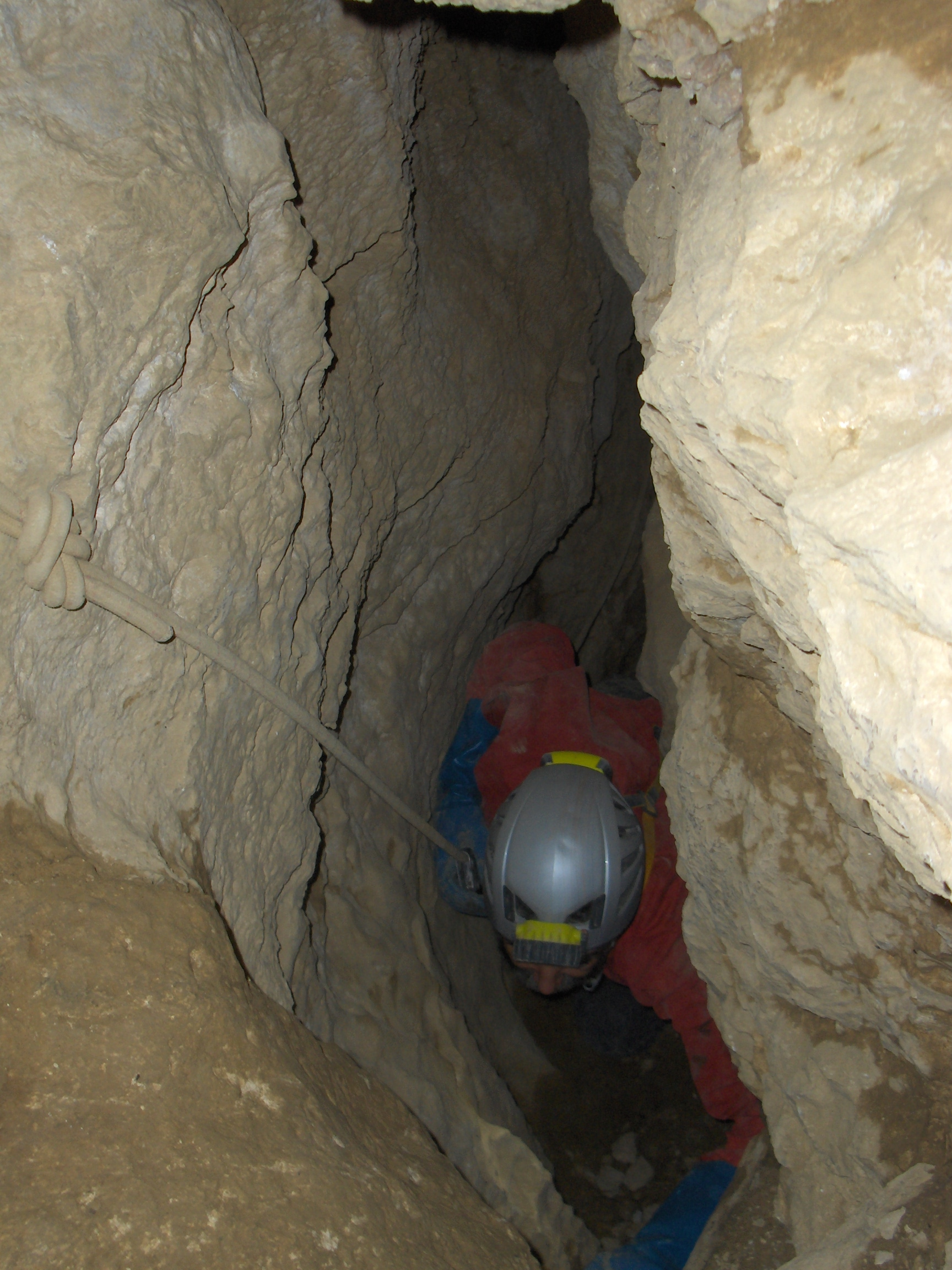
The entrance of the Bob Vouay pothole, the highest entry of the Dent de Crolles network.

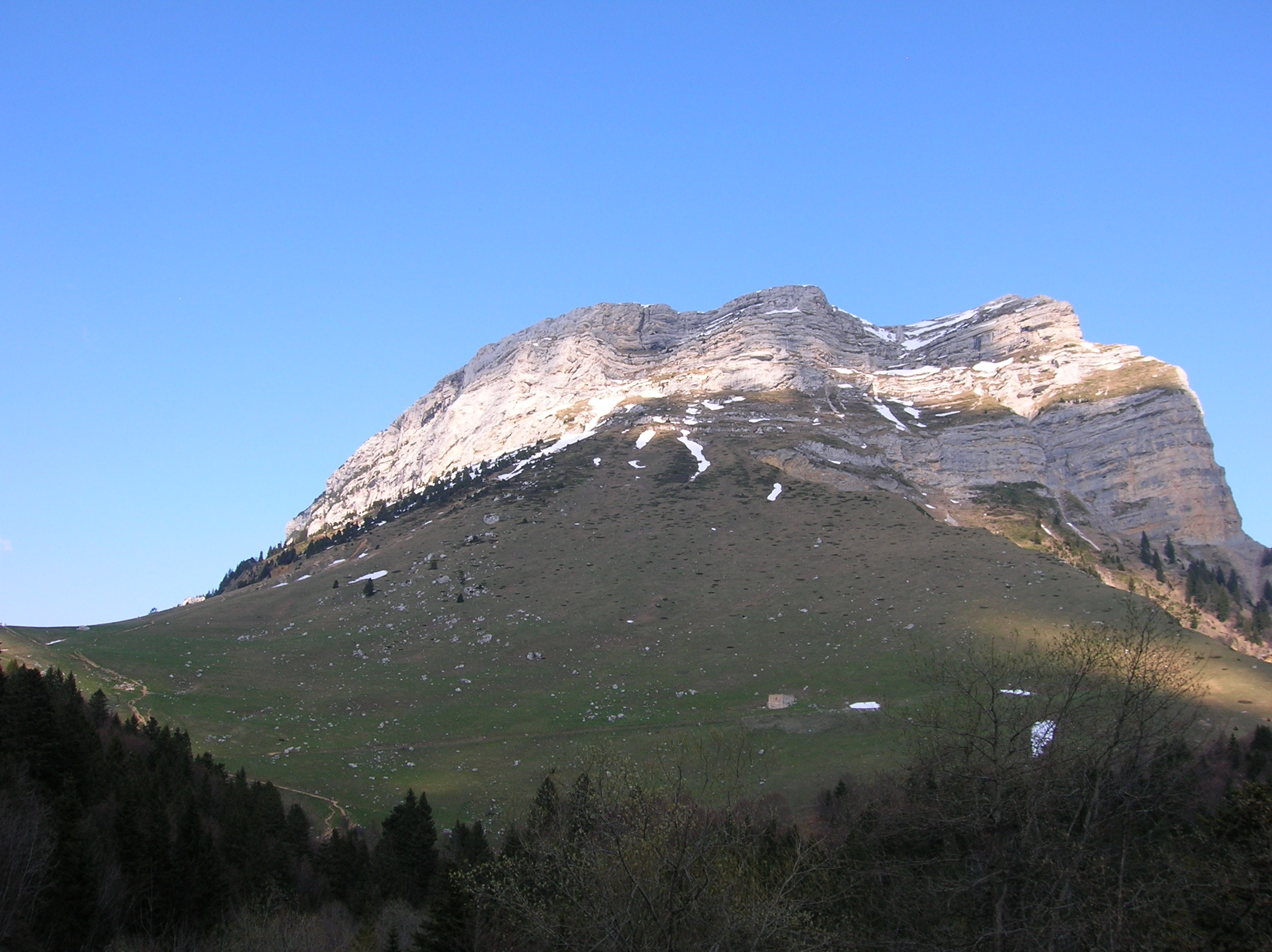
The Dent de Crolles, the col and the habert des Ayes from the col du Coq (south-west).

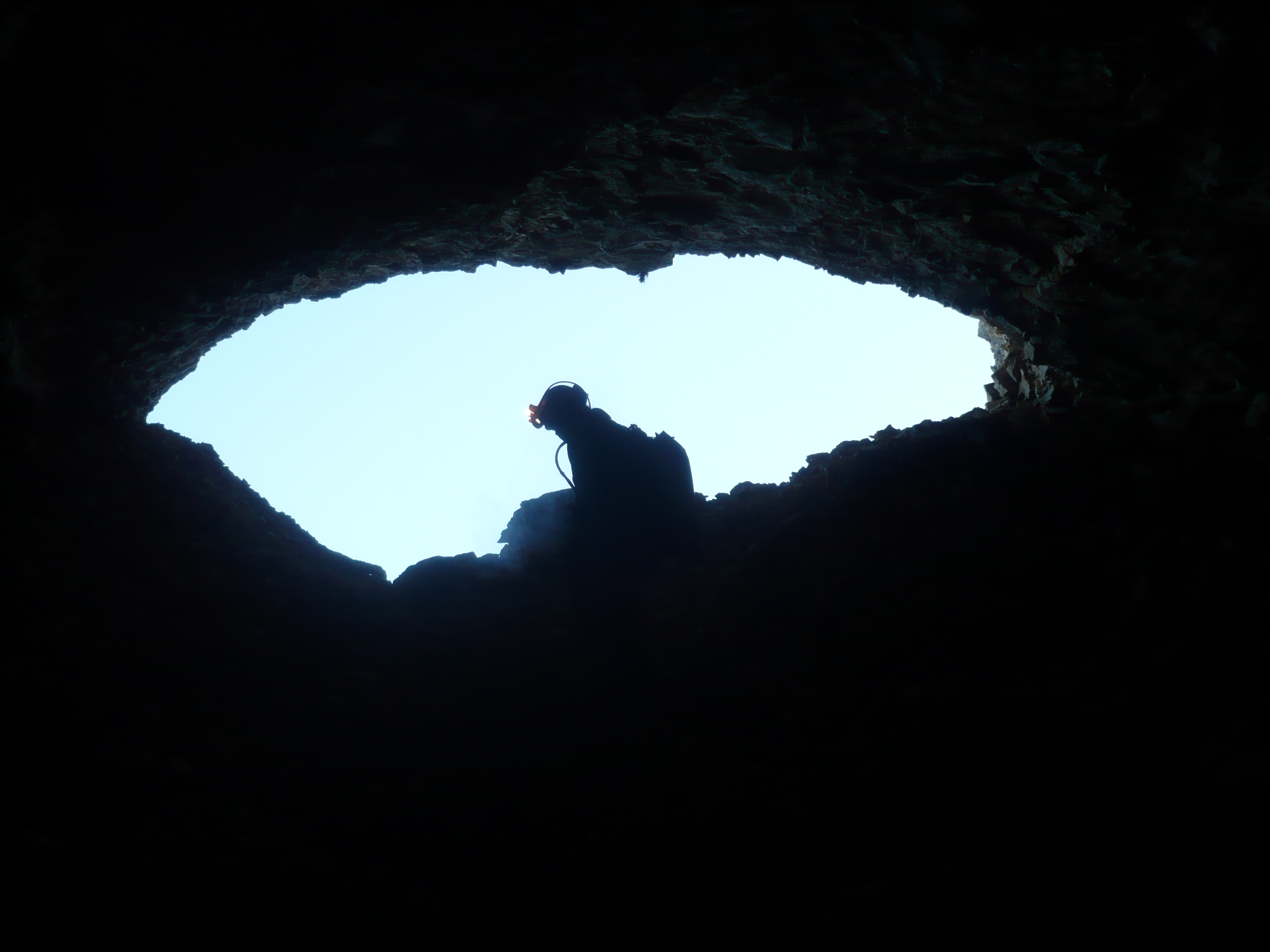
The Chevalier cave from the inside.

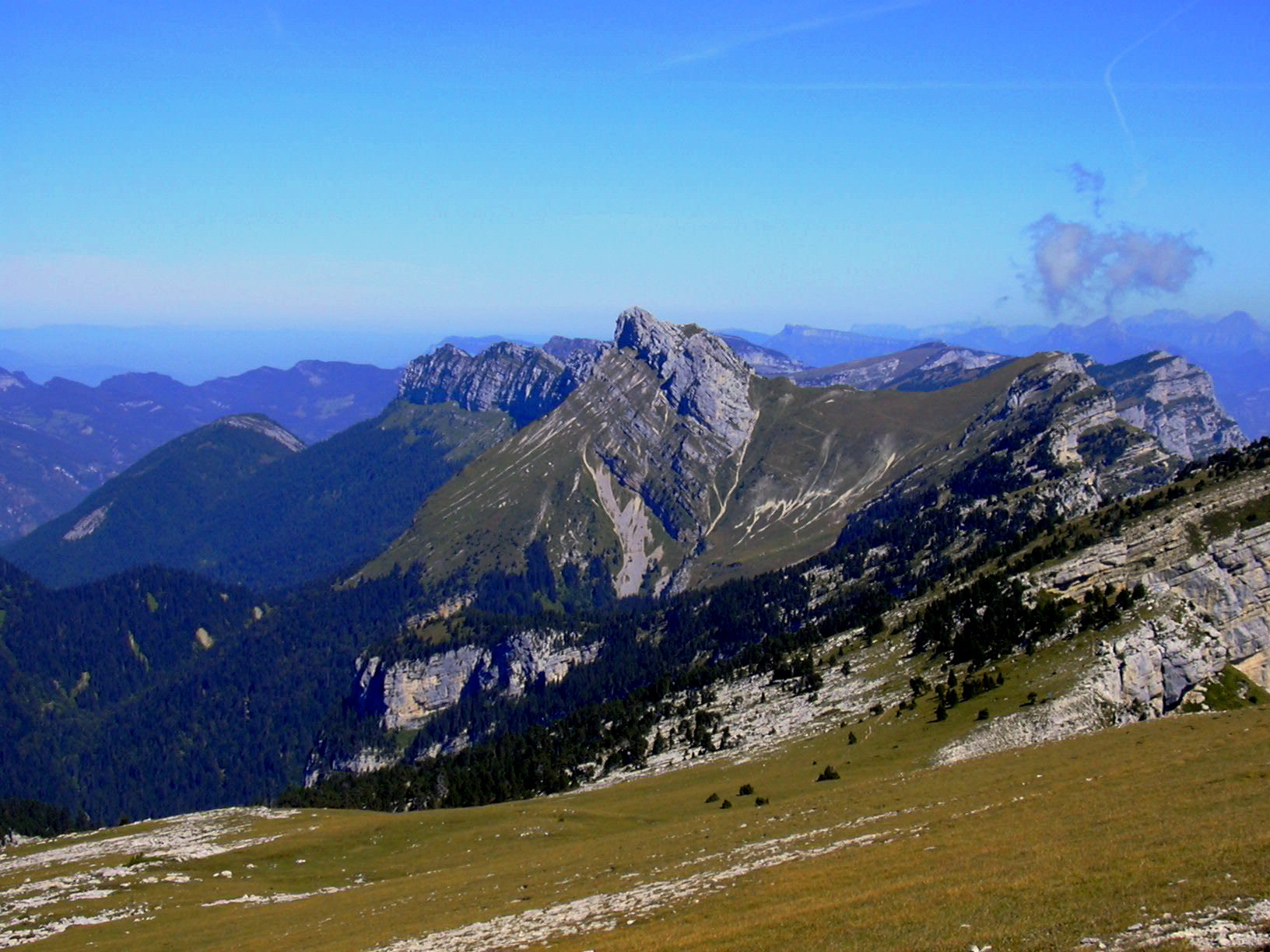
From the summit, a panorama of the Chartreuse massif: the Lances de Malissard overhanging the col de Bellefond.

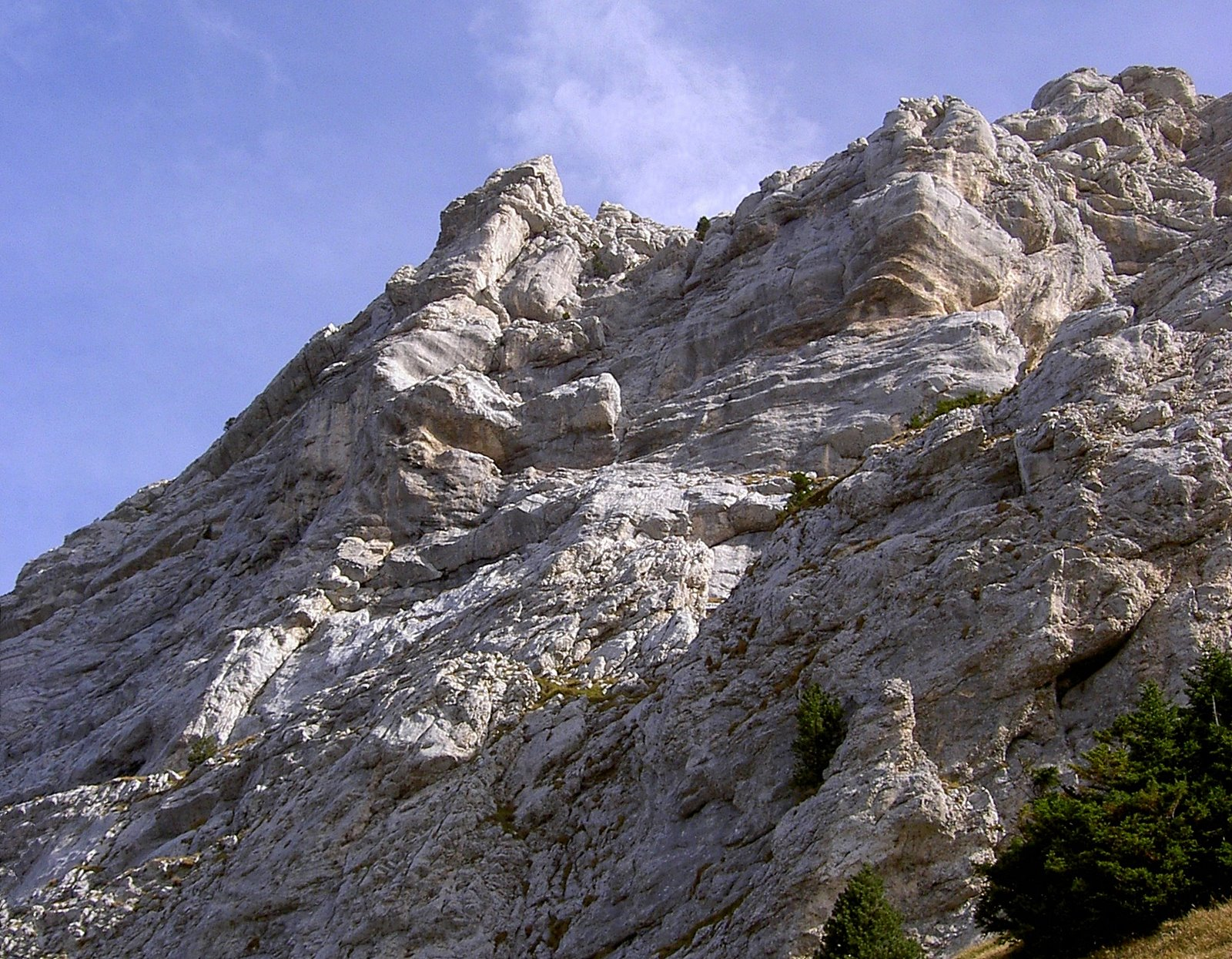
Close up on Dent de Crolles and the Poussez Pas Derrière ascent route.

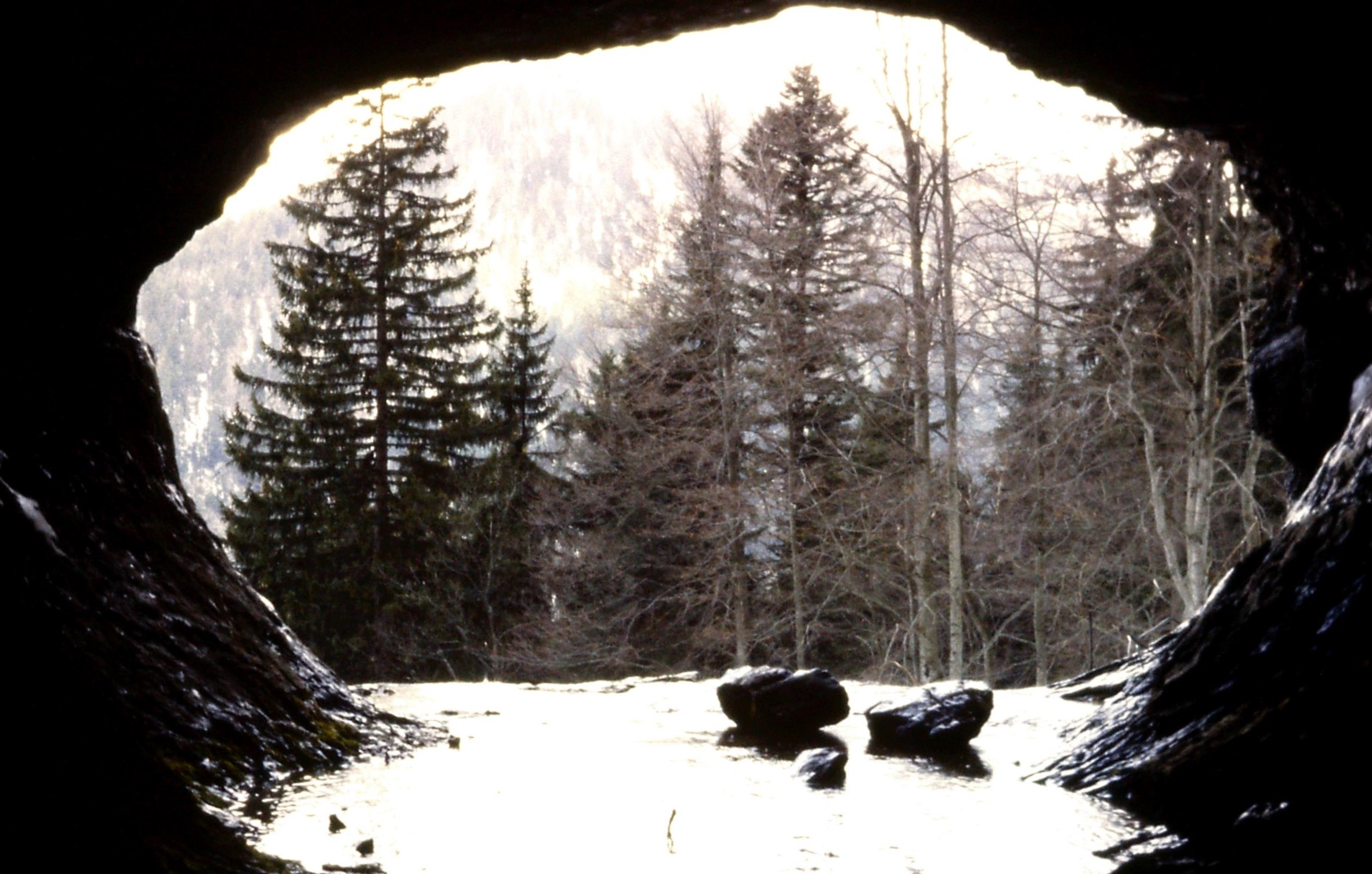
Entrance to the cave of Guiers Mort, the karst spring of the Dent de Crolles network.

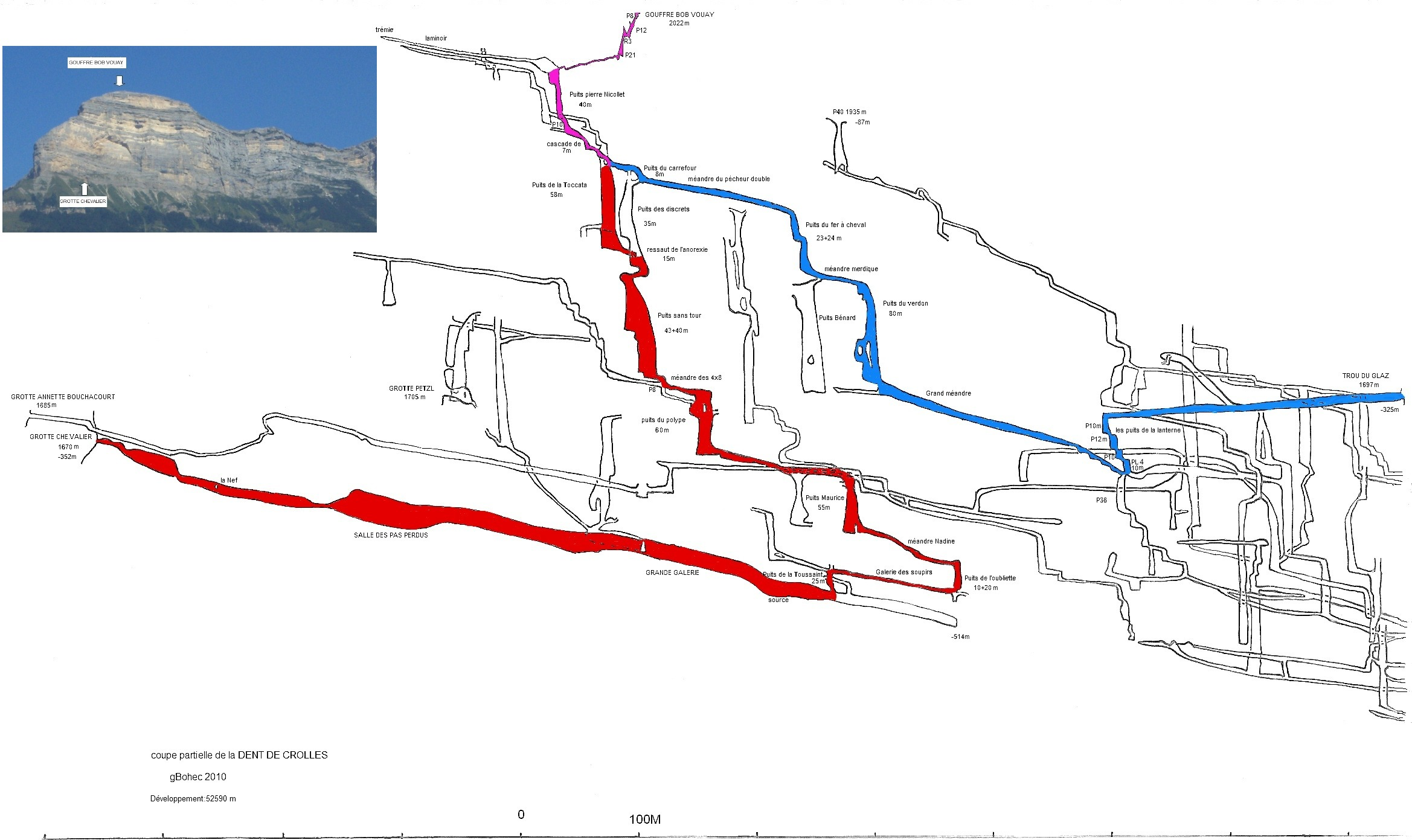
Cross section of the Dent de Crolles at the Chevalier cave.

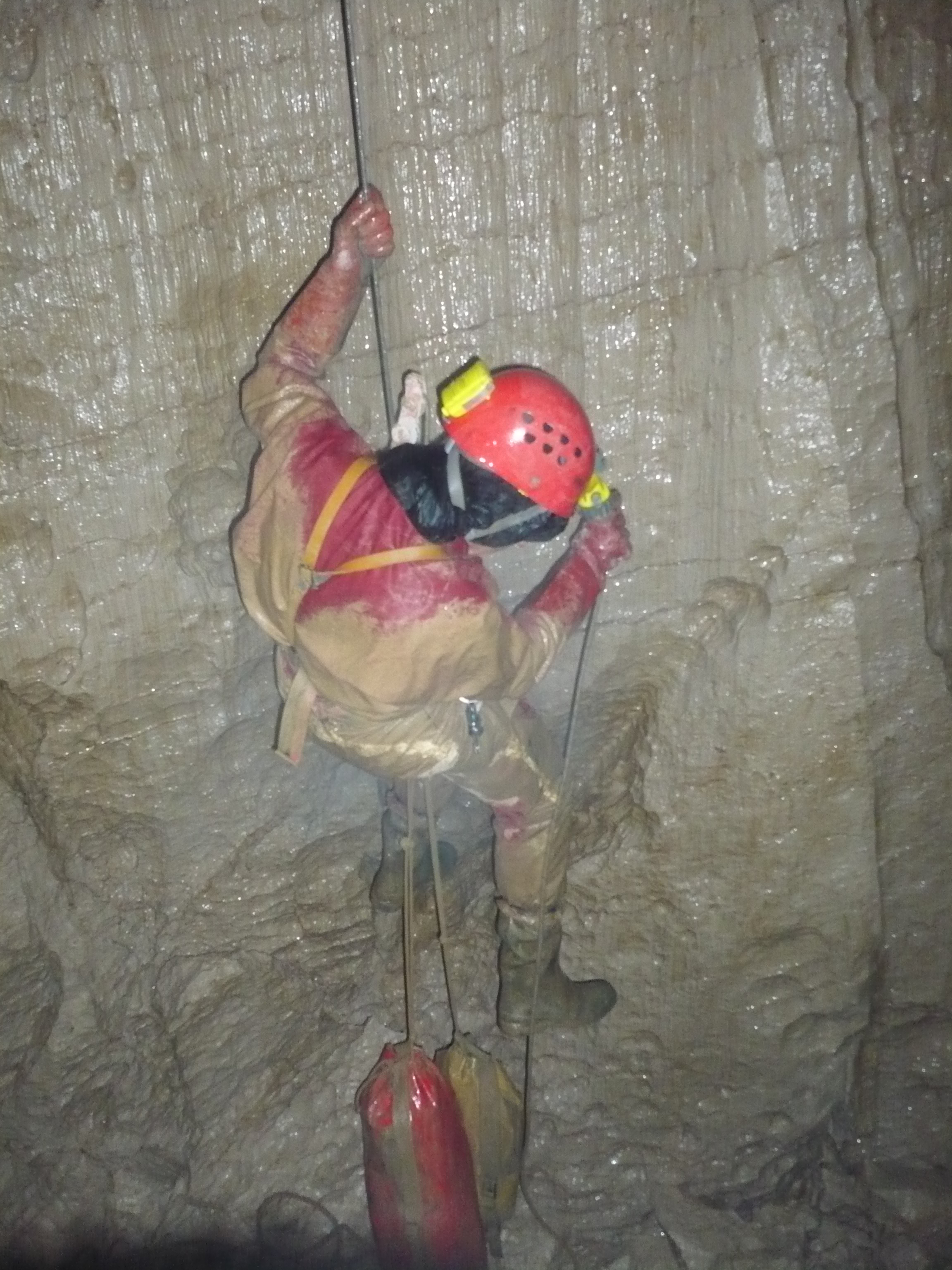
Pitch into the Dent de Crolles.

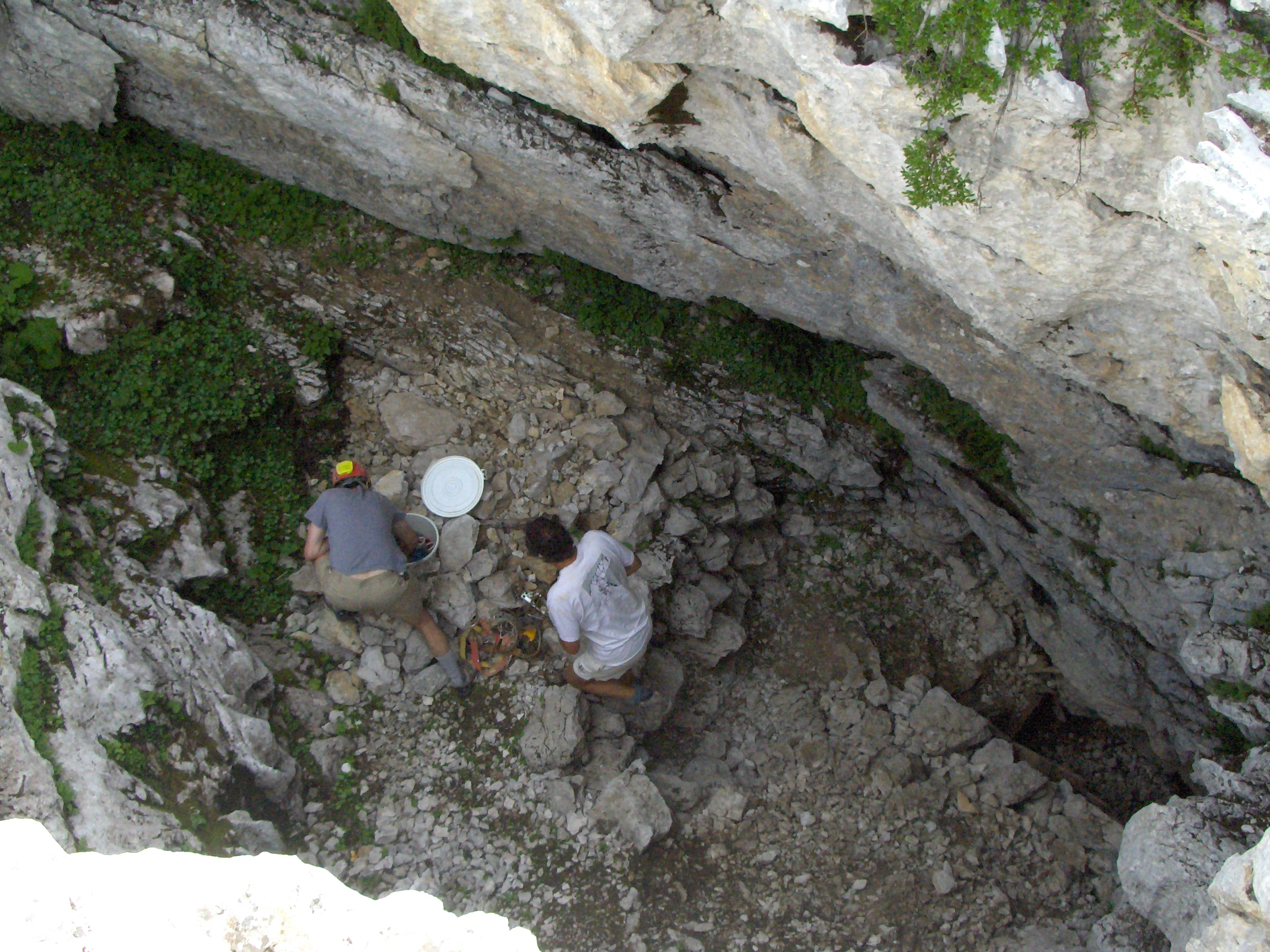
The Bob Vouay pothole.

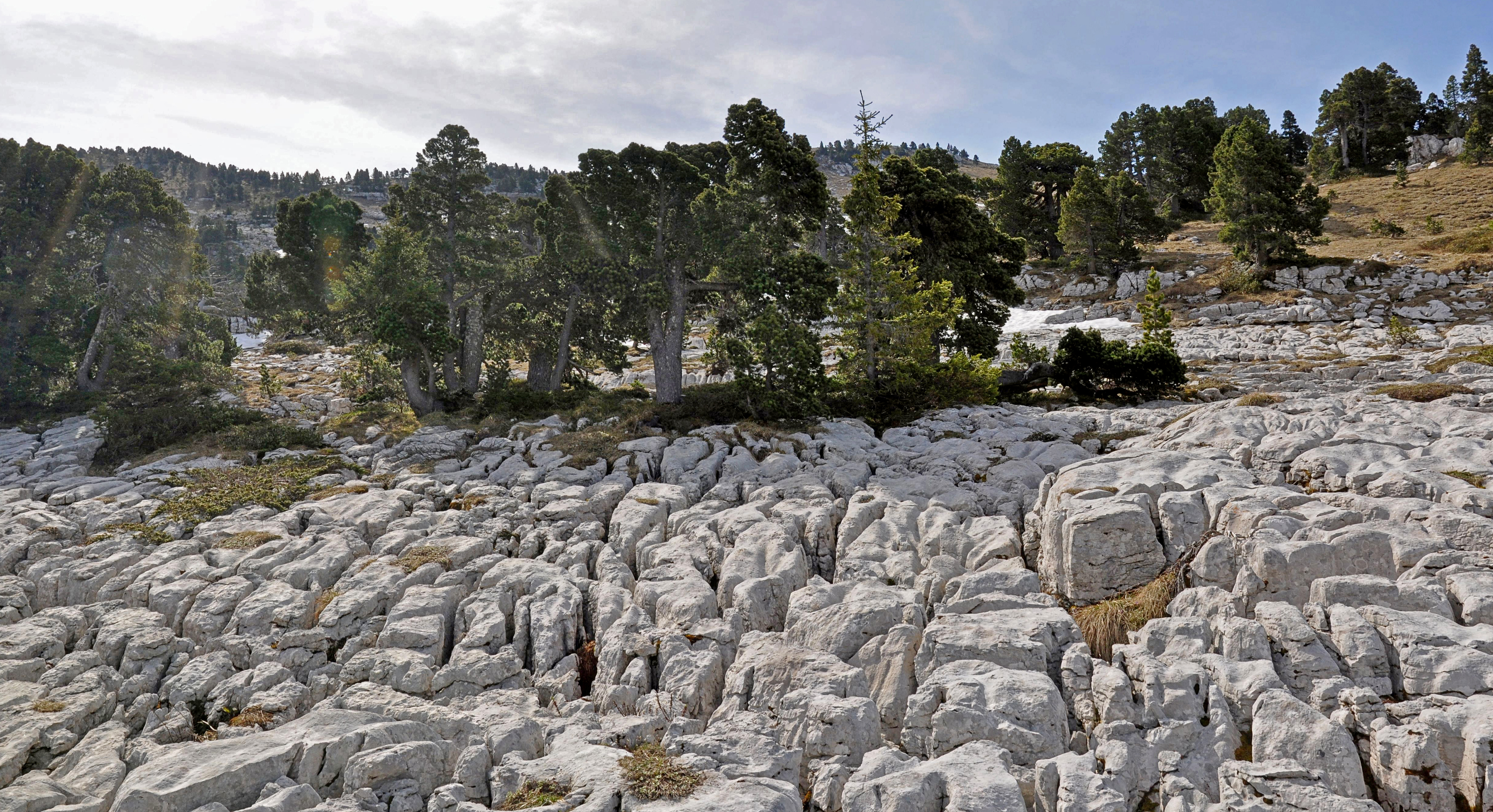
Limestone pavement of la Dent de Crolles.

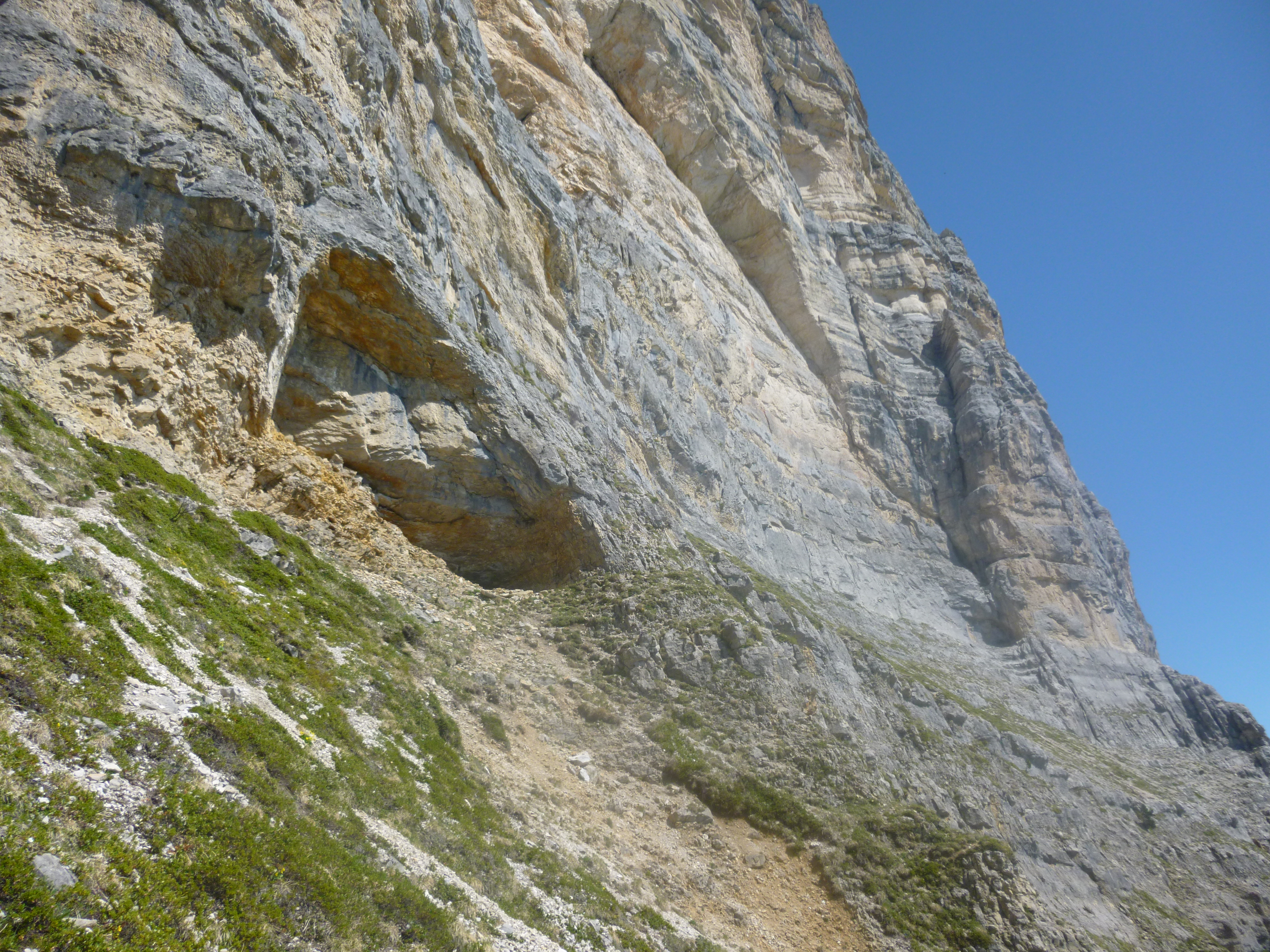
Entrance to the cave Chevalier.

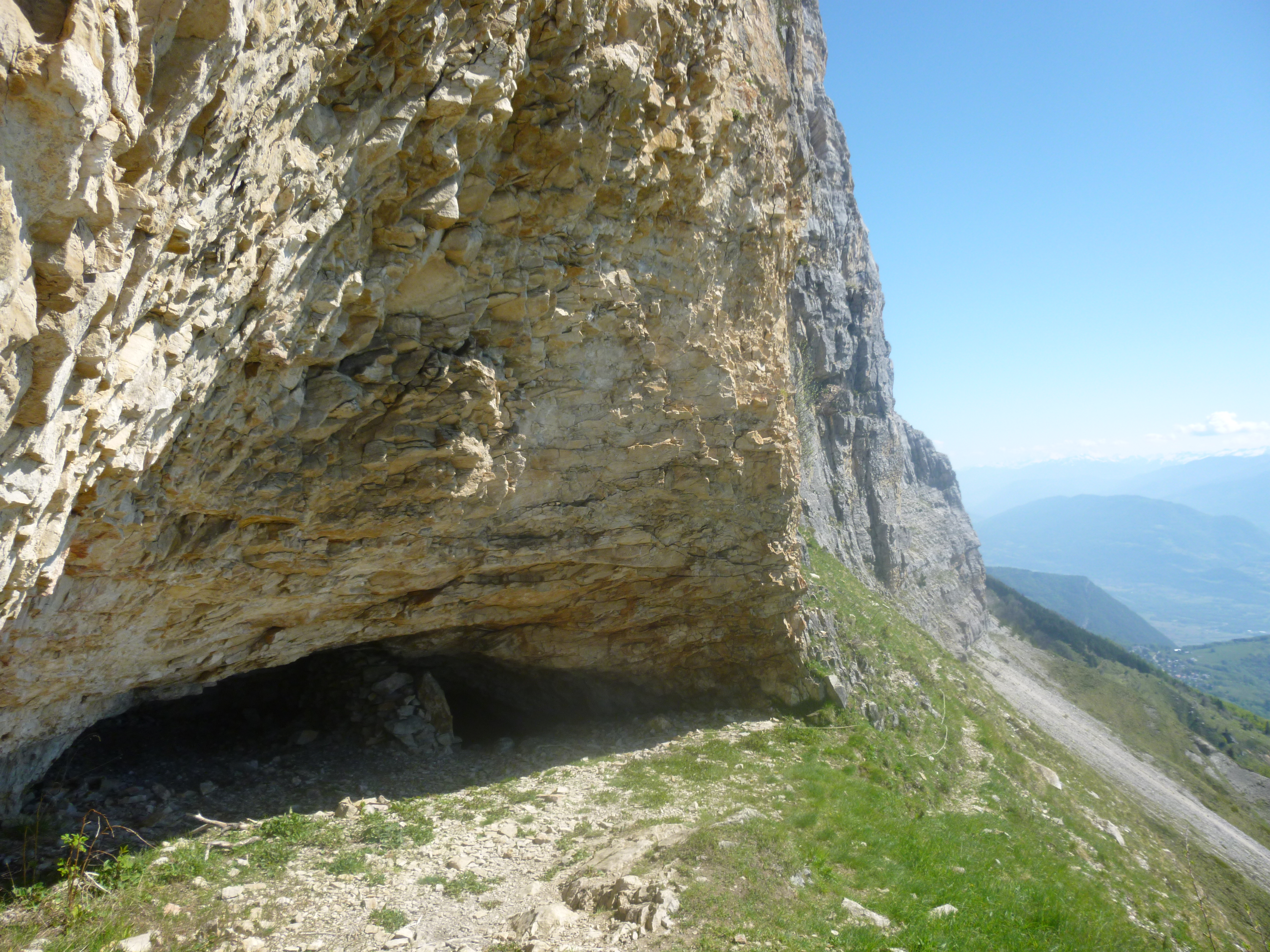
Entrance to the cave Annette.

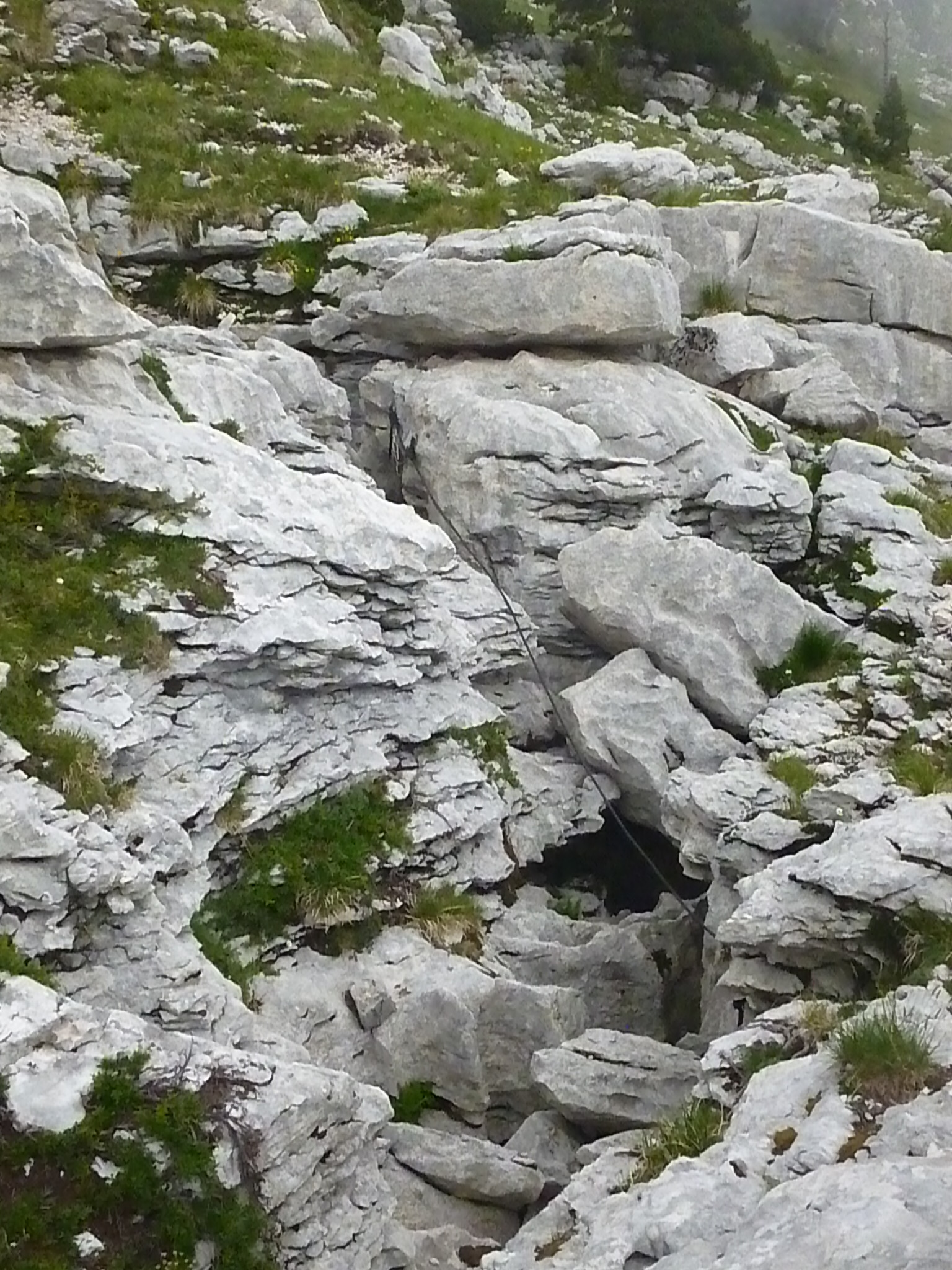
The P40.

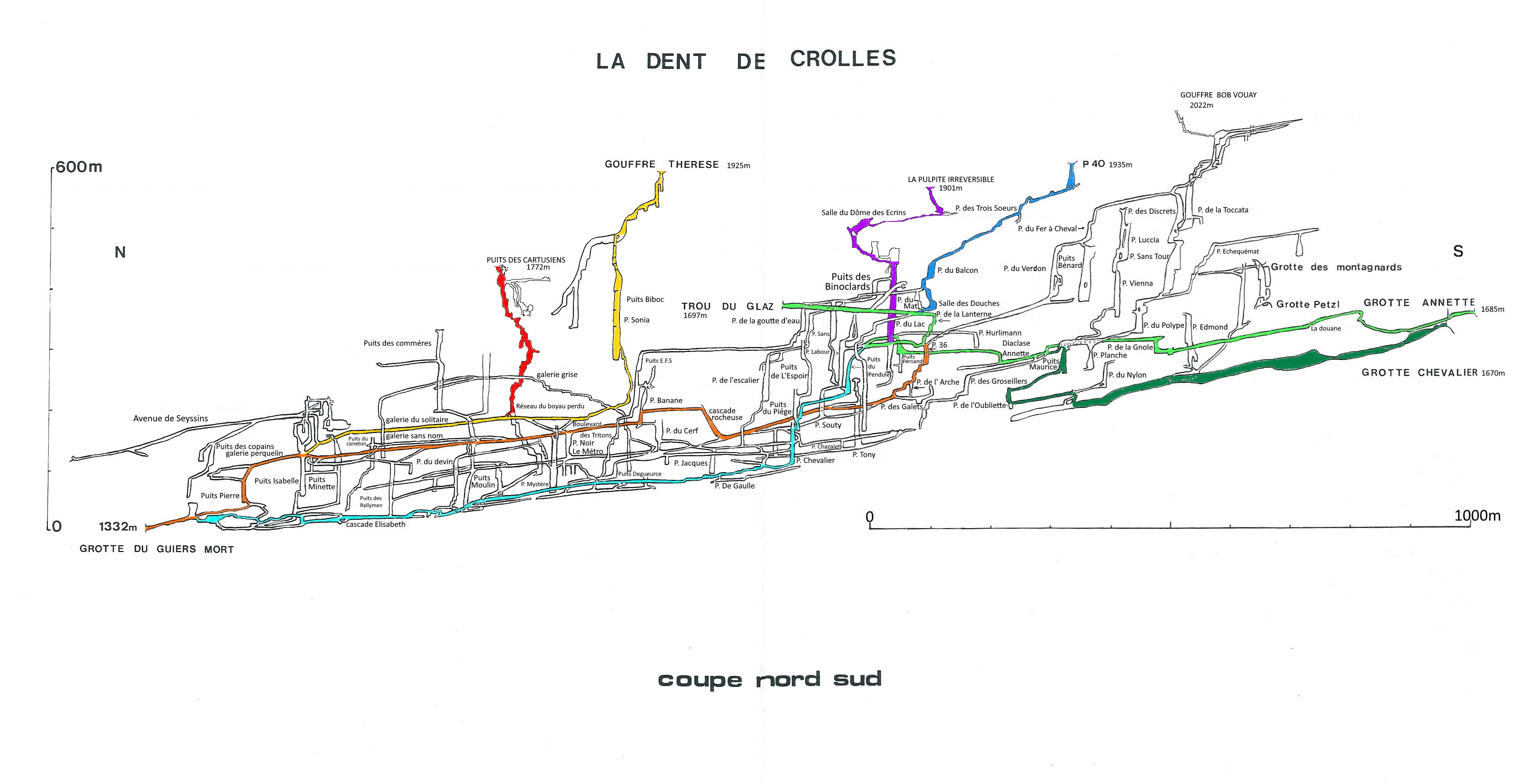
On the cross-section are represented the main crossings: in light green Glaz-Annette, in dark green Glaz-Chevalier, in blue P40-Glaz, in orange Glaz-Guiers Mort, in blue Glaz-Guiers Mort by the river, in yellow Thérése-Guiers, in red Cartusiens-Guiers, in purple Pulpite Irreversible-Glaz. Other crossings can be made: Bob Vouay-Glaz or Guiers but they are not coloured.

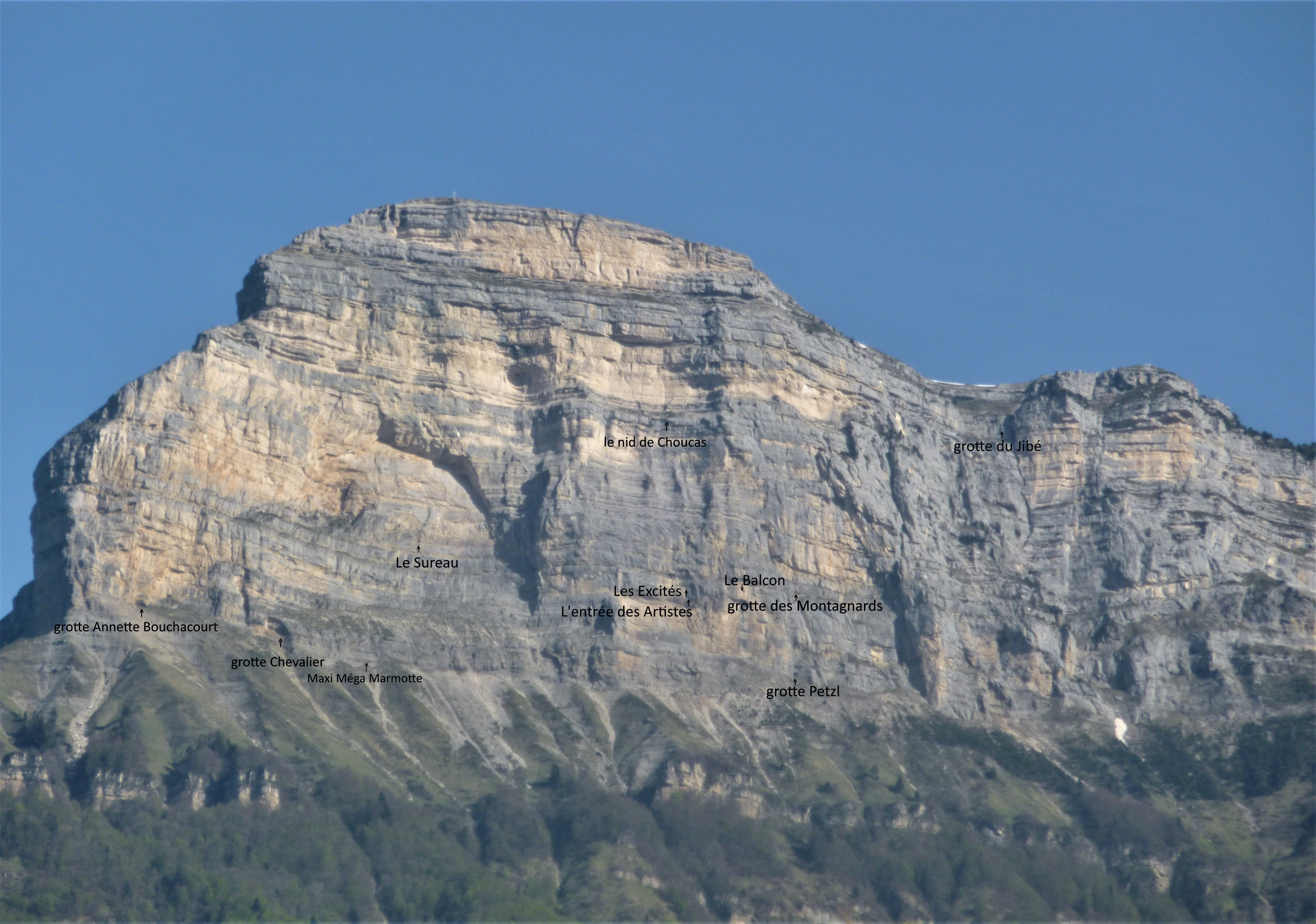
Caves of the East face: Grotte Annette, grotte Chevalier, Maxi Méga Marmotte, le Sureau, l'Entrée des Artistes, les Excités, le Balcon, le nid de Choucas, grotte Petzl, la grotte des Montagnards et la grotte du Jibé.

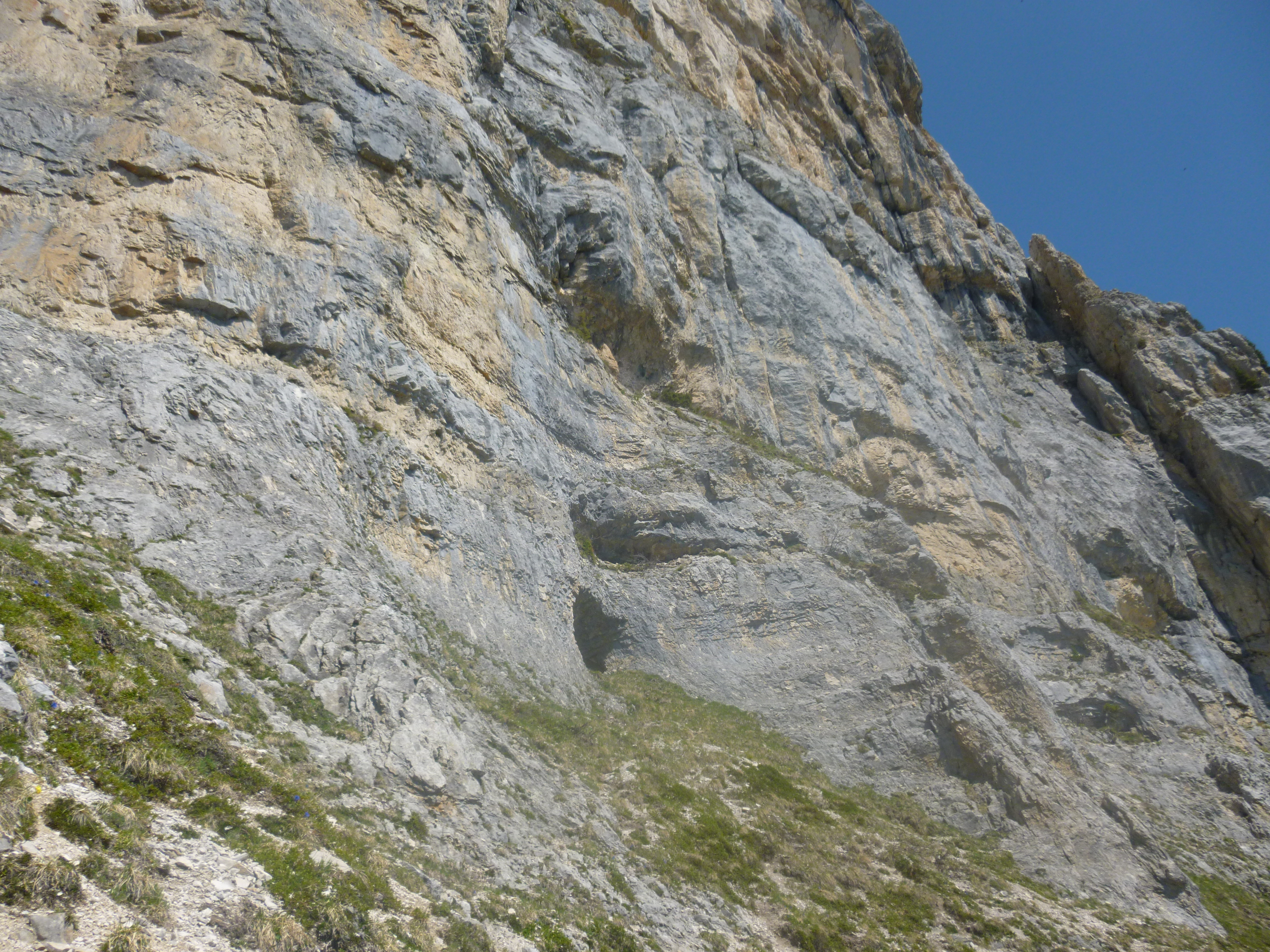
Cave Petzl separated by a boulder choke from the network of the Dent de Crolles.

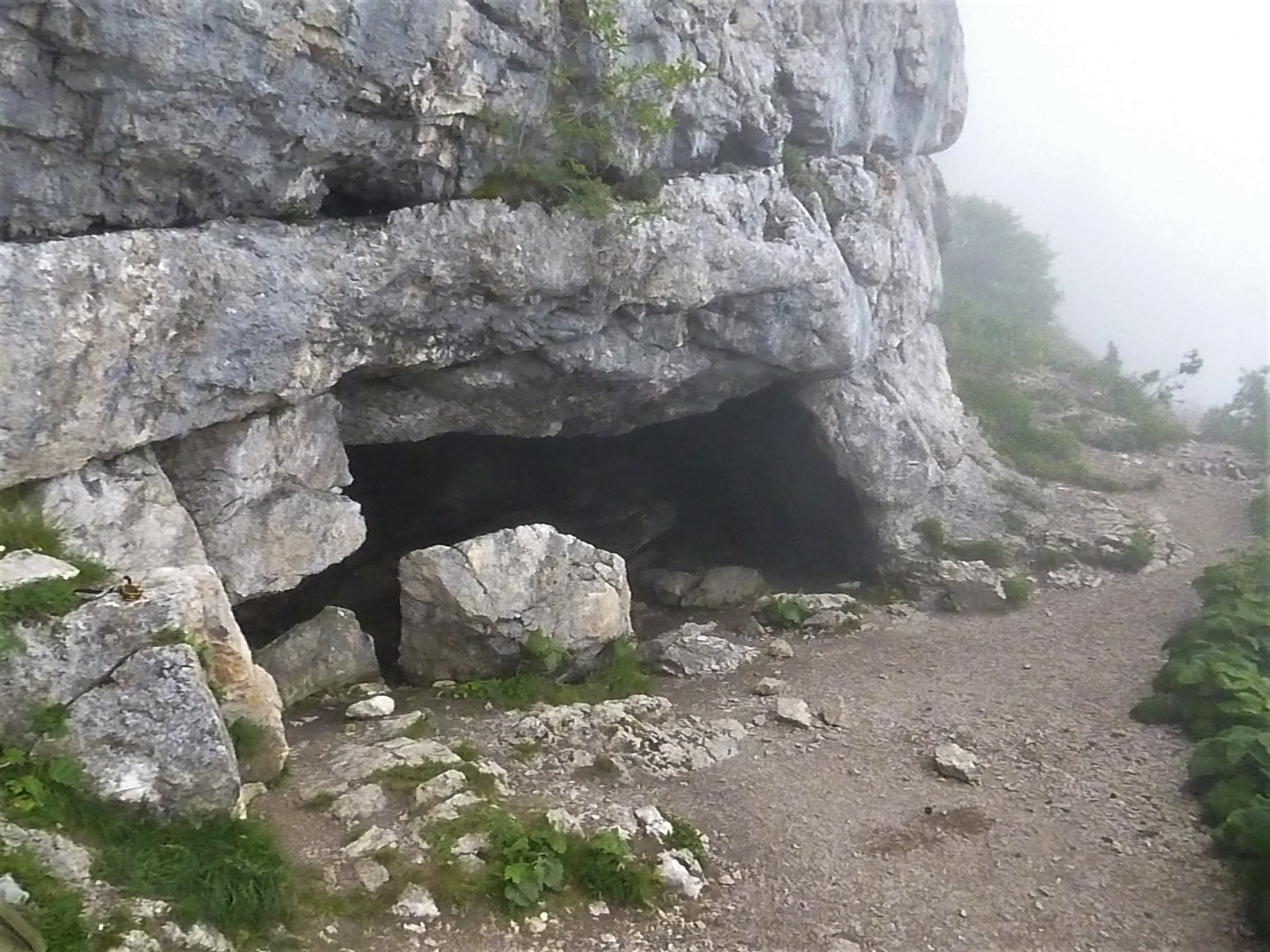
Entrance of Trou du Glaz.

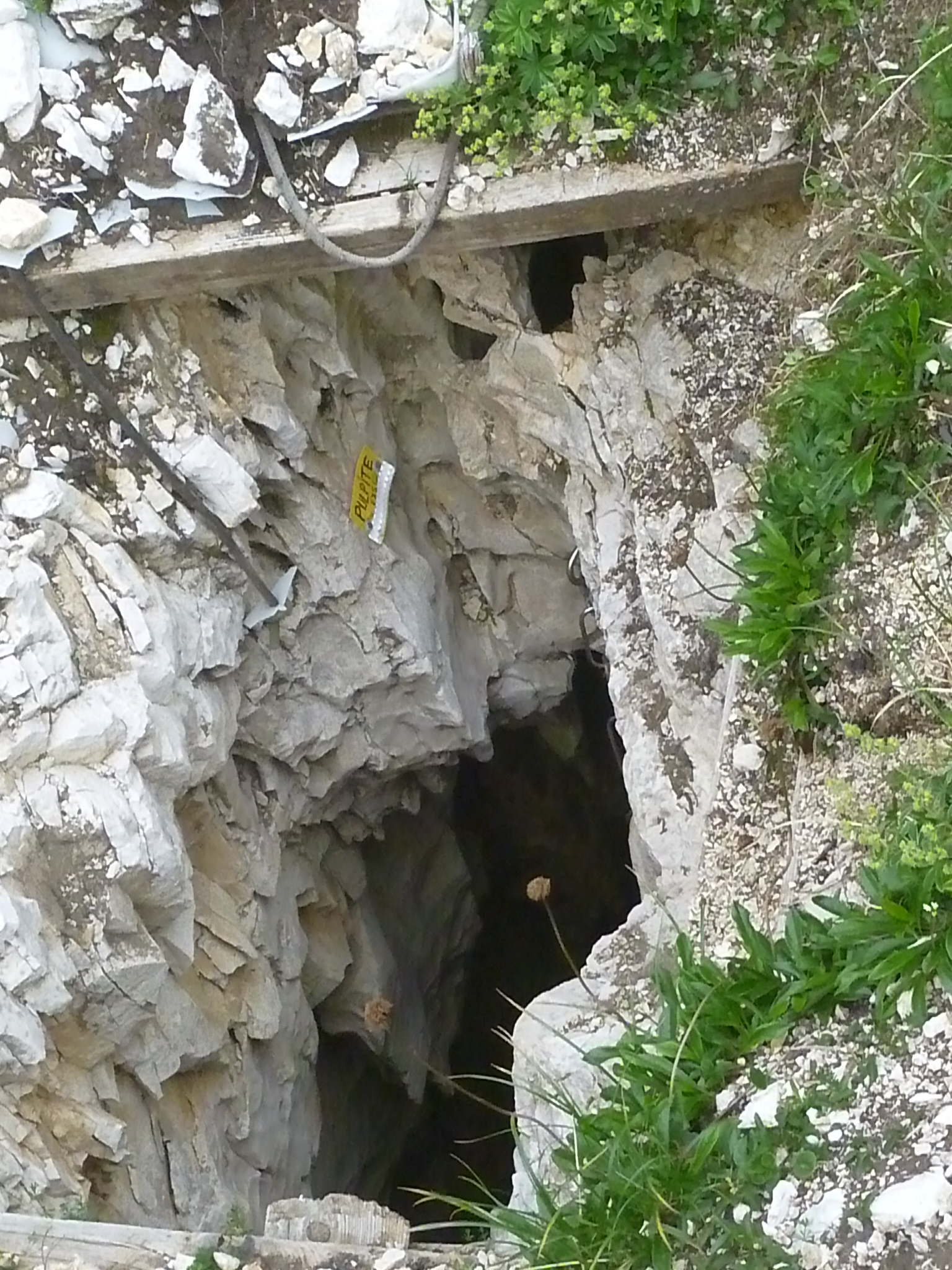
The pothole of Pulpite.

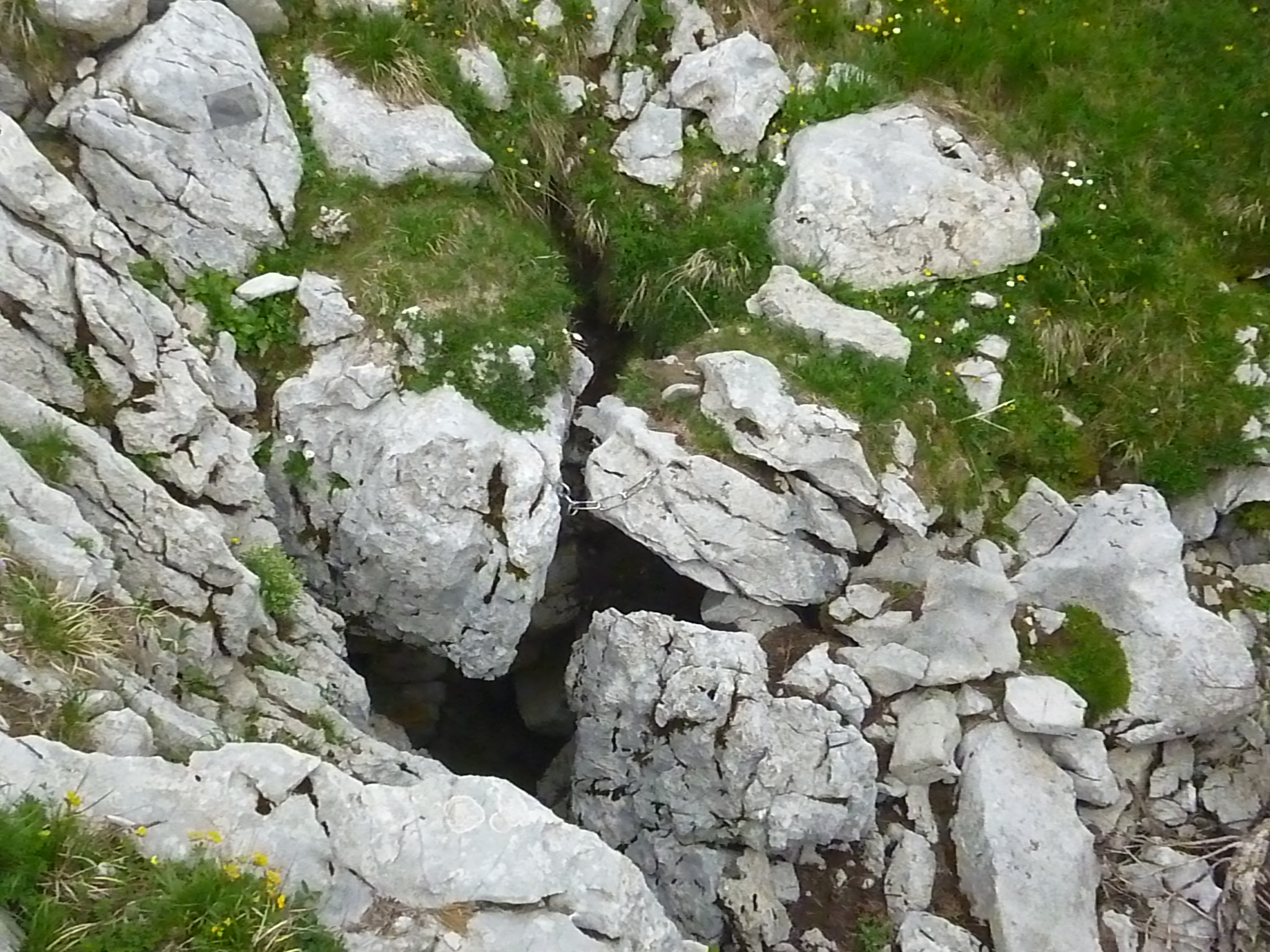
Therese's cave.

== Bibliography (in French) ==
- La Dent de Crolles et son réseau souterrain, Comité départemental de spéléologie de l'Isère, 1997, ISBN 2-902670-38-9 : "La Dent de Crolles et son réseau souterrain" (PDF).

== Bibliography (in English) ==
- Système de grottes de la Dent de Crolles, France in Encyclopedia of Cave and Karst Science (pp. 283–285) of John Gunn : Philippe Audra (January 2004). "Dent de Crolles cave system, France".

== References (in French) ==
- Site géologique
- Groupe Montagnard des Petites Roches : informations sur le site d'escalade du Luisset.
- escalade/ski/randonnée à la Dent de Crolles sur c2c
- Nouvelles topos de la dent de Crolles, Spéléo Secours Isère, 4 janvier 2015.
