= Plateau-des-Petites-Roches =

- Commune
- Location of Plateau-des-Petites-Roches
- Location within France Location within Auvergne-Rhône-Alpes
- Coordinates: 45°18′37″N 5°53′16″E
- Country: France
- Region: Auvergne-Rhône-Alpes
- Department: Isère
- Arrondissement: Grenoble
- Canton: Le Moyen Grésivaudan
- Intercommunality: CC Le Grésivaudan

Government
  - Mayor (2020–2026): Dominique Clouzeau
- Area^{1}: 36.91 km^{2} (14.25 sq mi)
- Highest elevation: 2,060 m (6,760 ft)
- Lowest elevation: 593 m (1,946 ft)
- Population (2023): 2,433
  - Density: 65.92/km^{2} (170.7/sq mi)
- Time zone: UTC+01:00 (CET)
  - Summer (DST): UTC+02:00 (CEST)
- INSEE/Postal code: 38395 /38660
- ^{1} French Land Register data, which excludes lakes, ponds, glaciers > 1 km^{2} (0.386 sq mi or 247 acres) and river estuaries.

Plateau-des-Petites-Roches (French pronunciation: [plato de pətit ʁɔʃ], lit. 'Plateau of the Little Rocks') is a commune in the Isère department in southeastern France. It was established on 1 January 2019 by merger of the former communes of Saint-Hilaire (the seat), Saint-Bernard and Saint-Pancrasse.

== Population ==
Population data refer to the commune in its geography as of January 2025.

Historical population
Year	Pop.	±% p.a.
1968	1,215	—
1975	1,445	+2.51%
1982	1,780	+3.02%
1990	2,130	+2.27%
1999	2,124	−0.03%
2007	2,654	+2.82%
2012	2,534	−0.92%
2017	2,434	−0.80%
2023	2,433	−0.01%
Source: INSEE

== See also ==
- Communes of the Isère department
