= Lumbin =

- Commune
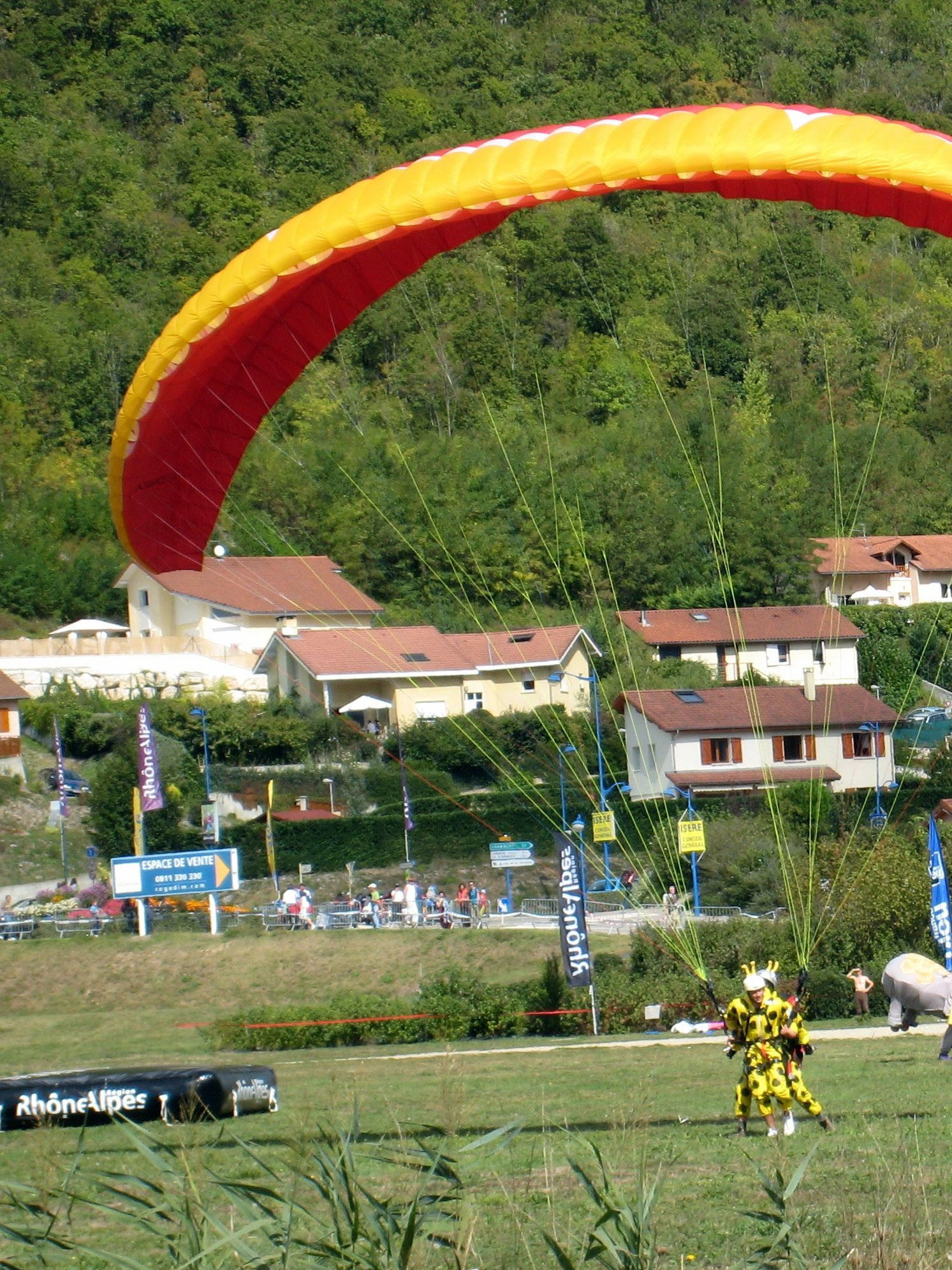
- Icarus Cup
- Location of Lumbin
- Location within France Location within Auvergne-Rhône-Alpes
- Coordinates: 45°18′26″N 5°54′48″E
- Country: France
- Region: Auvergne-Rhône-Alpes
- Department: Isère
- Arrondissement: Grenoble
- Canton: Le Moyen Grésivaudan
- Intercommunality: CC Le Grésivaudan

Government
  - Mayor (2020–2026): Pierre Forte
- Area^{1}: 7 km^{2} (2.7 sq mi)
- Elevation: 250 m (820 ft)
- Highest elevation: 880 m (2,890 ft)
- Lowest elevation: 222 m (728 ft)
- Population (2023): 2,164
  - Density: 310/km^{2} (800/sq mi)
- Time zone: UTC+01:00 (CET)
  - Summer (DST): UTC+02:00 (CEST)
- INSEE/Postal code: 38214 /38660
- ^{1} French Land Register data, which excludes lakes, ponds, glaciers > 1 km^{2} (0.386 sq mi or 247 acres) and river estuaries.

Lumbin (French pronunciation: [lœ̃bɛ̃]) is a commune in the Isère department in southeastern France.

== Population ==
Historical population

Year	Pop.	±% p.a.
1793	494	—
1800	528	+0.96%
1806	538	+0.31%
1821	652	+1.29%
1831	685	+0.49%
1836	668	−0.50%
1841	660	−0.24%
1846	640	−0.61%
1851	661	+0.65%
1856	628	−1.02%
1861	644	+0.50%
1866	627	−0.53%
1872	584	−1.18%
1876	570	−0.60%
1881	517	−1.93%
1886	502	−0.59%
1891	427	−3.18%
1896	390	−1.80%
1901	401	+0.56%

Year	Pop.	±% p.a.
1906	388	−0.66%
1911	352	−1.93%
1921	350	−0.06%
1926	339	−0.64%
1931	329	−0.60%
1936	336	+0.42%
1946	267	−2.27%
1954	382	+4.58%
1962	390	+0.26%
1968	395	+0.21%
1975	488	+3.07%
1982	709	+5.48%
1990	936	+3.53%
1999	1,464	+5.10%
2007	1,897	+3.29%
2012	2,080	+1.86%
2017	2,136	+0.53%
2023	2,164	+0.22%

Source: EHESS and INSEE (1968-2023)

== Twin towns ==
Lumbin is twinned with:

- Vipava, Vipava, Slovenia, since 2005

== See also ==
- Communes of the Isère department
- Funiculaire de Saint-Hilaire du Touvet
