= Saint-Pancrasse =

- Part of Plateau-des-Petites-Roches
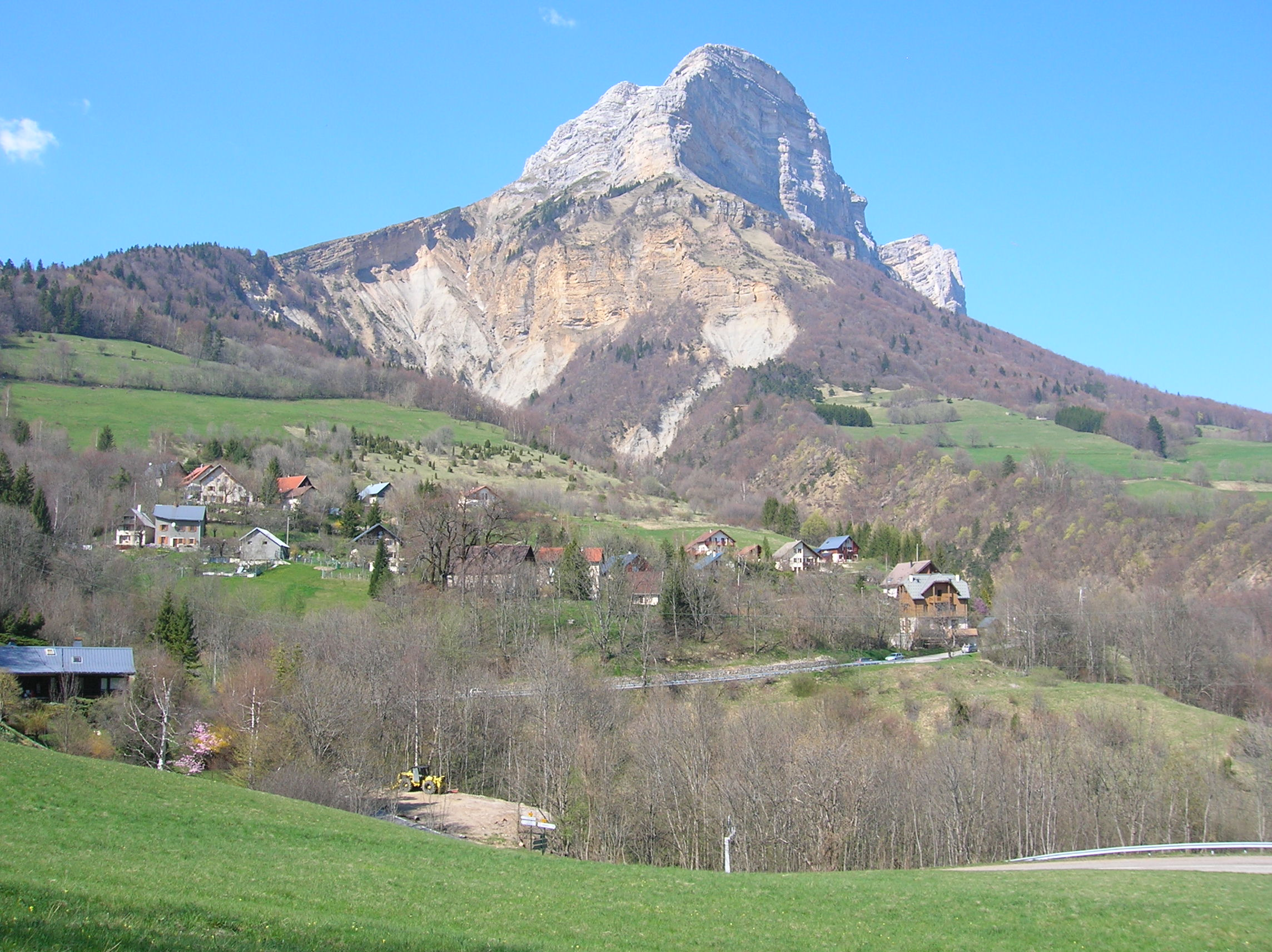
- Dent de Crolles

- Coat of arms
- Location of Saint-Pancrasse
- Location within France Location within Auvergne-Rhône-Alpes
- Coordinates: 45°17′34″N 5°51′38″E
- Country: France
- Region: Auvergne-Rhône-Alpes
- Department: Isère
- Arrondissement: Grenoble
- Canton: Le Moyen Grésivaudan
- Commune: Plateau-des-Petites-Roches
- Area^{1}: 7 km^{2} (2.7 sq mi)
- Elevation: 1,000 m (3,300 ft)
- Highest elevation: 2,060 m (6,760 ft)
- Lowest elevation: 760 m (2,490 ft)
- Population (2023): 454
  - Density: 65/km^{2} (170/sq mi)
- Time zone: UTC+01:00 (CET)
  - Summer (DST): UTC+02:00 (CEST)
- Postal code: 38660
- ^{1} French Land Register data, which excludes lakes, ponds, glaciers > 1 km^{2} (0.386 sq mi or 247 acres) and river estuaries.

Saint-Pancrasse (French pronunciation: [sɛ̃ pɑ̃kʁas]) is a former commune in the Isère department in southeastern France. On 1 January 2019, it was merged into the new commune Plateau-des-Petites-Roches.

== Population ==
Historical population

| Year | Pop. | ±% p.a. |
|---|---|---|
| 1800 | 230 | — |
| 1821 | 290 | +1.11% |
| 1846 | 311 | +0.28% |
| 1872 | 303 | −0.10% |
| 1901 | 265 | −0.46% |
| 1926 | 188 | −1.36% |
| 1946 | 181 | −0.19% |
| 1962 | 152 | −1.09% |

| Year | Pop. | ±% p.a. |
|---|---|---|
| 1968 | 136 | −1.84% |
| 1975 | 177 | +3.84% |
| 1982 | 249 | +5.00% |
| 1990 | 348 | +4.27% |
| 1999 | 408 | +1.78% |
| 2010 | 438 | +0.65% |
| 2015 | 442 | +0.18% |
| 2023 | 454 | +0.34% |

Source: EHESS and INSEE (2010-2023)

== See also ==
- Communes of the Isère department
