= Raymond Durand (politician) =

French politician (1945–2025)

Deputy of the French National Assembly for Rhône's 11th constituency
- In office 2 June 2008 – 19 June 2012
- Preceded by: Georges Fenech
- Succeeded by: Georges Fenech

Mayor of Chaponnay
- In office 20 March 1989 – 6 January 2025
- Preceded by: Jean-Paul Rolland
- Succeeded by: TBD

Member of the General Council of Rhône for the Canton of Saint-Symphorien-d'Ozon
- In office 27 March 1994 – 29 March 2015
- Preceded by: Odette Pourcel
- Succeeded by: Jean Jacques Brun; Mireille Simian

Personal details
- Born: 1 October 1945; Saint-Priest, France
- Died: 6 January 2025 (aged 79)
- Political party: UDF; LC; UDI

Raymond Durand (1 October 1945 – 6 January 2025) was a French politician of the Union for French Democracy (UDF), the New Centre (NC), and the Union of Democrats and Independents (UDI).

== Life and career ==
Born in Saint-Priest on 1 October 1945, Durand was first elected mayor of Chaponnay in 1989. He was re-elected in 1995, 2001, 2008, 2014, and 2020. In 1994, he was elected to the General Council of Rhône, where he served until his defeat by the National Front, the Union for a Popular Movement, and the Socialist Party in 2015.

Durand was the substitute for Georges Fenech in the National Assembly from the Rhône's 11th constituency. Following the invalidation of the constituency's result in 2007, Durand took office following a by-election in which he defeated socialist candidate Jean-François Gagneur. In 2012, Fenech ran under the UMP label and drew their support, which caused Durand to run under the NC label. However, he was defeated after only obtaining 7.88% of the vote in the first round.

Raymond Durand died on 6 January 2025, at the age of 79.
