= Joël Matencio =

French serial killer (1948-2022)

- Born: 6 September 1948; Heugleville-sur-Scie, France
- Died: 24 January 2022 (aged 73); Paris, France
- Other name: "The Man of Red Brigades"
- Conviction: Murder x3
- Penalty: Life imprisonment (released in 2001)

Details
- Victims: 3-4
- Span of crimes: 3 July 1974 – 24 July 1976
- Country: France
- States: Rhône, Isère
- Date apprehended: 15 August 1974 (first time); 20 October 1976 (second time)

Joël Isidore Matencio (6 September 1948 – 24 January 2022) was a French serial killer and criminal.

Matencio was first implicated in the murder of a CEO, who was killed in July 1974 before being found four months later. He was charged along with two other men and briefly imprisoned between August 1974 and March 1975, before being released along with one of the three defendants.

During this release, Matencio kidnapped and murdered three other people in June and July 1976, under the name ‘Red Brigades’ and ‘Group 666’, with the aim of collecting a ransom. The case gave rise to a veritable ‘manhunt’ and caused a huge stir in the local press in Isère. Arrested on 20 October, after his voice was recognised on television, Matencio was charged with murder and imprisoned. After five years in custody, he was sentenced on 31 October 1981 to life imprisonment for the three murders and attempted frauds. The case against the CEO was dismissed in February 1985.

After suffering a stroke in 1995, Matencio was released on 14 December 2001 on medical grounds. In 2004, the European Court of Human Rights ruled that the authorities were at fault in relation to Matencio's state of health. Following false rumours of his death in 2009, Matencio died on 24 January 2022, aged 73.

== Biography ==
=== Early life and first court cases ===
Joël Matencio was born on 6 September 1948 in Villard-Bonnot. He has an older sister.

In his youth, he quickly became acquainted with the law, through theft and petty burglary, and tinkered with a few ‘weapons’ himself, which he used to commit his misdeeds. Matencio is also very literary about the crimes he commits, and likes to send letters to the newspapers in which he recounts his misdeeds as the main character in these cases. He was quick to express his desire to ‘make a name for himself’.

On 19 September 1966, Matencio, aged 18, Bernard C., aged 16, and Christian C., aged 14, began a series of acts of vandalism in Grenoble, dubbed the Belphégor affair by the press and media. Over a period of eight days, Matencio and his two accomplices used slingshots to throw nail-cavaliers at passers-by and smash 1,000 shop windows to smithereens. This series of misdeeds claimed 17 victims, one of whom was a policeman who questioned Matencio and his accomplices; Matencio was seriously injured in the eye. Matencio and his accomplices were arrested on 27 September, but claimed that the crime had been committed as a result of a game they had discovered. After being held in police custody, the three perpetrators were charged with damage and unintentional violence. Only Matencio was placed in a rehabilitation centre, while Bernard and Christian were released.

Matencio married in 1970 and became the father of two children. In 1973, Matencio was arrested for pimping and imprisoned in the La Santé Prison. There he met Daniel Le Sant, one of his fellow inmates, with whom he struck up a friendship. The criminal court sentenced Matencio to one year's imprisonment. Matencio was released in February 1974 and moved to Lyon to find a job. He frequented the Grand Hôtel de Lyon, where Yves Marin-Laflèche was chairman and CEO. Matencio worked as a waiter, but didn't do much work. He regularly ended up unemployed because of his absence from work.

=== Murder of Yves Marin-Laflèche ===
Yves Marin-Laflèche disappeared during the evening of 3 July 1974, before being murdered in mysterious circumstances at the age of 42. On the morning of 4 July, Marin-Laflèche's personal secretary arrived at the Monts d'Or house that the CEO had bought for a pittance, but was surprised to find the door closed. The caretaker, whose house is downstairs, explained that Marin-Laflèche's Alfa Romeo was not in the driveway as usual this morning. Surprised by Marin-Laflèche's absence, the secretary then dialled the number of the legal advisor, Jean-Gérard Calvy, but he said he hadn't heard from him since the previous evening. Later that day, a group of antique dealers from Grenoble, whom Marin-Laflèche was due to see in person, called on Marin-Laflèche's behalf. On 9 July, Marin-Laflèche's car was found on the Quai Perrache in Lyon, with no trace of the driver. A judicial investigation into ‘kidnapping and illegal restraint’ was finally opened following this discovery.

Investigations into Marin-Laflèche's personality showed that he was a passionate homosexual, unstable, drawing people of unequal morality into his whirlwind, shuffling large sums of money, showing himself to be by turns downcast or triumphant, capable of extreme kindness and reckless folly. We also note that the missing man was familiar with two former prisoners already convicted of burglary who had been released a few months earlier: Joël Matencio, aged 25, and Daniel Le Sant, aged 32. The investigation also revealed that Calvy, the legal adviser, had no real connection with the missing man, as some people told the investigators that Marin-Laflèche feared Calvy. Furthermore, a witness stated that on the night of 6 to 7 July 1974 he had seen Le Sant, alone, at the wheel of Mr Marin-Laflèche's car, in the very place where the police had found the vehicle.

On 31 July, Calvy, aged 33, was arrested and taken into custody. Although he denied the charges against him, two days later Judge François Renaud charged him with fraud and ‘kidnapping’ and remanded him in custody.

=== Implicated in the Marin-Laflèche murder ===
On 15 August 1974, Matencio and Le Sant were arrested in turn and taken into police custody for questioning about the disappearance of Marin-Laflèche. During the questioning, Le Sant said something that caught the gendarmes' attention: ‘Before you accuse someone, you have to start by finding the body’. Although the two men in custody denied being behind the disappearance, Judge Renaud charged Matencio and Le Sant with ‘kidnapping and illegal detention’ of Yves Marin-Laflèche and remanded them in custody.

On 3 November, a body was discovered in an advanced state of decomposition in the forest near Villefranche-sur-Saône. Marin-Laflèche's housekeeper, Mme Dury, formally recognised the belongings as having belonged to Marin-Laflèche, in view of the bathrobe in which the remains had been wrapped and a towel that had been found. An autopsy of the body was carried out, but after four months in the open air, it proved difficult due to the condition of the body. The forensic pathologist concluded that the body had been shot because of a bullet casing that had been found. Once the body had been identified, the examining magistrate ordered a confrontation between Matencio and Le Sant.

On 8 November, Matencio and Le Sant were taken from their respective prison cells to face three witnesses. This confrontation led to Matencio and Le Sant being charged, this time with murder, for which they risked the death penalty. Back in prison, the accused, with the help of their lawyers, applied for their release on the grounds that their pre-trial detention was unjustified.

A request for release was made on 15 November, insisting that there was insufficient evidence to charge Matencio and Le Sant with the murder of Yves Marin-Laflèche. Matencio and his defence counsel, Mr Joannès Ambre, decided to rely on a procedure set out in article 662 of the Code of Criminal Procedure, under which the Criminal Division of the Court of cassation may relinquish jurisdiction over any investigating or trial court and refer the case to another court of the same jurisdiction: either if the court with normal jurisdiction cannot be legally constituted, or if the course of justice is otherwise interrupted, or on grounds of legitimate suspicion. On 13 March 1975, the Indictments Division of the Lyon Court of Appeal granted Matencio and Le Sant's request for release, approving the fact that their remand in custody was not justified.

=== Release ===
Matencio and Le Sant were released on 14 March 1975, after more than seven months in prison. Only Calvy remained in prison, as he was being prosecuted for fraud on the basis of highly damning evidence. Following his release, Matencio returned to live with his wife in Isère, whose relationship with him had deteriorated considerably due to his conviction for murder and the fact that he was refused a job in view of the situation. He was briefly taken on as a petrol station attendant, but was later dismissed.

In September, Matencio faked a burglary in his marital home and set it on fire. He reported the incident, but was soon identified as the perpetrator of the fake burglary, not least because of his previous criminal record. When questioned, Matencio admitted that he had faked the burglary because his involvement in the Marin-Laflèche case had prevented him from finding a steady job. He was sentenced to one month's imprisonment, with extenuating circumstances, and walked free of the courtroom.

On 16 June 1976, Matencio bought a 7.65 × 17 mm Browning pistol from his friend Tomassini. The next day, he confided in one of his friends about his financial difficulties, explaining that he could no longer find work because of the Marin-Laflèche affair, and admitting that he might ‘do something stupid’.

=== Double murder of Christian Leroy and Muriel Ferrari-Trabelsi ===
On the night of 19 June 1976, Matencio kidnapped Christian Leroy, a 24-year-old coach driver, and Muriel Ferrari-Trabelsi, a 21-year-old single mother, and loaded them into Leroy's car as they left a meeting in Grenoble. Matencio drove several kilometres with his hostages and stopped in a wood in Saint-Martin-d'Uriage. He killed Christian and Muriel with his 7.65-calibre pistol and hid the bodies of his victims under mats of earth, before leaving the scene of the crime and returning home. The next day, Leroy's wife was concerned that he had not returned from work and decided to report him missing. The case was not taken seriously, however, as Leroy was over 18, giving him the right to disappear.

On 22 June, Matencio sent a letter to Le Dauphiné Libéré, under the name ‘Red Brigades’ and ‘Group 666’, in which he explained that he was holding Christian Leroy and Muriel Trabelsi hostage and told the newspaper that he would only release them if a ransom of 400 million Francs was paid. In addition, a new letter from the ‘Red Brigades’ reached the Grenoble public prosecutor on 24 June, with a claim reduced to 50 million francs and a request for free public transport in the Grenoble area for a period of ten days; this request was not granted. A judicial investigation was opened for ‘kidnapping and false imprisonment’.

Matencio sent a third letter on 30 June, in which he indicated the location of the victims' car. Investigators found the vehicle on a road in the Seiglières forest. By telephone, he arranged a meeting with the Grenoble public prosecutor, but failed to attend. At the beginning of July, Matencio set the ransom at 400 million francs.

=== Murder of Olga Moïssenko ===
On the night of 23 to 24 July 1976, at around 1am, Matencio abducted Olga Moïssenko, aged 21, from a car park in Saint-Martin-d'Hères, while she was in her car with her fiancé, Marc Chavot. After overpowering Chavot with his pistol, Matencio loaded Moïssenko into his car and drove to a wood in Gières (near the ruins of the Château de Gières), where he shot and killed the young woman before burying her body and driving off. For his part, Chavot reported his girlfriend's abduction, giving a brief description of her kidnapper: ‘1.70 metres’, ‘20-25 years old’, ‘medium-length brown hair’. A new judicial investigation was opened into the kidnapping.

Subsequently, Matencio made several telephone calls to Le Dauphiné Libéré and sent several letters to the mayor of Échirolles, Georges Kioulou, the mayor of Grenoble, Hubert Dubedout, and the CEO of Le Dauphiné Libéré, Louis Richerot, reiterating the demands made during the previous kidnapping. The father of the missing girl, Yvan Moïssenko, called the kidnapper to obtain information about his daughter's abduction, but he gave nothing. A meeting between the ‘Red Brigades’ and the police was set for 28 July.

=== The ‘Red Brigades’ and ‘Group 666’ affair ===
At the end of July 1976, the press and media picked up on the affair, now known as the ‘Red Brigades’ and ‘Group 666’, but made the mistake of publicising the meeting arranged by the ‘Red Brigades’. Matencio heard the news and decided not to go to the phone boxes for fear of being arrested. The investigators in charge of the case soon realised that ‘Group 666’ never went to the appointments they had set up, leaving them in doubt as to whether it even existed. What's more, the police were convinced that a single perpetrator was linked to the three abductions, based on Chavot's testimony. Shortly after the story broke, Matencio managed to find a job as a waiter and gave up writing to the press for several weeks. The search continued for the bodies of the three missing men, but to no avail.

On 29 September, Matencio sent another letter, signed ‘Red Brigades’ and ‘Group 666’, claiming that he had killed Leroy and Trabelsi because no ransom had been paid. He gave the location of the bodies, which he said he had buried in a wood in Saint-Martin-d'Uriage. This information was quickly passed on to the investigators, who went to the scene the next day to find the two bodies. The two victims were found on 1 October, following directions given by the kidnapper. Leroy and Trabelsi were quickly identified from their clothing and personal effects found at the scene. The autopsy showed that death had been caused by a 7.65 calibre bullet, but contradicted the statements as to the date of death. The state of decomposition of the bodies, linked in particular to the drought of 1976, showed that the death had occurred several months earlier - at the time of the disappearance - and not a few days earlier as Matencio, still unidentified, had stated.

Following the discovery of Christian and Muriel's bodies, the judicial investigation was reclassified as murder. Major resources were deployed. As for Matencio, he went to Paris for a few days' holiday. The 8pm news on 19 October decided to broadcast the voice of the ‘Man of the Red Brigades’ and the letters he had sent. Matencio's sister and brother-in-law saw the programme and recognised his voice and handwriting, which were similar to that of the ‘Man from the Red Brigades’, and informed the police station. In addition, four other people recognised Matencio's voice after hearing it in the newspaper.

=== Arrest, imprisonment and trial ===
On 20 October 1976, Matencio, aged 28, was arrested at his nursing home and taken into custody at Grenoble police station for the murders of Leroy and Trabelsi and the disappearance of Moïssenko. At the start of his interrogation, Matencio denied any link with ‘Group 666’ and denied any involvement in the crimes. This argument was undermined when Matencio's voice was compared to the six people who had formally identified him. What's more, Matencio's handwriting was formally recognised by those close to him when they were shown his writings. Matencio acknowledged that he was the author of the calls and letters sent, but claimed that he had acted under threat from ‘Group 666’. When questioned about the existence of this group, Matencio stated that he did not know anything about it.

At the end of his police custody, on 22 October, Matencio was charged with murder, in relation to Leroy and Trabelsi, ‘kidnapping and illegal restraint’, in relation to Moïssenko, as well as robbery and attempted fraud. He was remanded in custody at the Grenoble-Varces prison. In addition to Matencio's arrest, Joseph-Francis Miggliacio, one of Matencio's close friends, was taken into custody, but quickly released.

Matencio's arrest caused a stir in the local press, especially as it came just two years after he was implicated in the Marin-Laflèche case. The portrait of a serial killer gradually took shape, although this image was only American in the 1970s. In France, 1976 was also marked by the arrests of Bernard Pesquet and Marcel Barbeault, two particularly prolific serial killers. In the same way as these two killers, it appears that Matencio acted alone for a specific motive: financial. In addition, Matencio was questioned on numerous occasions, to no avail, in order to find Olga's body, which the investigators believed at that stage to be dead.

During his detention, Matencio underwent several psychiatric examinations to determine his criminal responsibility. The psychiatric experts charged with examining the defendant concluded that Matencio had committed his crimes without the slightest impairment of his discernment, going so far as to accuse third parties in order to exonerate himself. In addition, the experts emphasised his intention to ‘make a name for himself’ when committing his crimes, which was tantamount to narcissism. Matencio was therefore deemed entirely responsible for his actions. Matencio's lawyer, Joannès Ambre, delayed the trial for a long time - five years - due to the political climate in France concerning the abolition of the death penalty, which was deemed inevitable for the criminal, until the election of François Mitterrand, which put an end to its application. On 10 July 1981, Matencio was finally brought before the Grenoble Assize Court on charges of murder, kidnapping, robbery and attempted fraud.

=== Trial and conviction ===
On 23 October 1981, Matencio's trial began before the Grenoble Assize Court. He was 33 years old at the time. On his arrival in the courtroom, Matencio stuck to his last version of events, explaining that he had been threatened and held by the fictitious ‘Red Brigades’ group. The trial focused in particular on the myth of ‘Group 666’ and the ‘Red Brigades’, which Matencio had invented purely for the purpose of extorting money, almost going so far as to pass himself off as a member of the Mafia. Matencio's narcissistic personality also stands out, with the aim of vindicating his crimes by showing himself to be superior to the police.

On the penultimate day of the trial, 29 October, Matencio finally admitted to the double murder of Leroy and Trabelsi, as well as the murder of Moïssenko, whose body has yet to be found. When the president of the court asked him where Moïssenko's body had been found, Matencio gave up, pointing to a spot in a wood in La Tronche. Unusually for an assize trial, the presiding judge decided to devote the hearing of 30 October to moving all the spectators to the location indicated by Matencio. Several searches were carried out at the location designated by Matencio, but these were unsuccessful and were abandoned.

On returning to the courtroom, the court described Matencio as manipulative and suspected him of having made the court move for yet another lie. Initially scheduled to end on 30 October, the trial was extended by a day due to the time spent on futile searches. The public prosecutor requested life imprisonment for the accused. On 31 October, Matencio was sentenced to life imprisonment, in accordance with the prosecution's request, for the murders of Christian and Muriel, the presumed murder of Moïssenko, as well as the thefts and the attempted theft of money.

=== Discovery of Olga Moïssenko's body and dismissal of the Marin-Laflèche case ===
In November 1981, Moïssenko's parents sent several letters to Matencio at the Grenoble-Varces prison, seeking information about the whereabouts of their daughter's body. Having received no reply from the prisoner, they contacted Matencio's parents. Matencio's mother decided to contact her own mother, as Matencio had a very close relationship with his grandmother.

At the end of December, Matencio's grandmother sent him a letter asking him to indicate the location of Olga Moïssenko's body. Matencio finally replied to his grandmother's letter and indicated the same wood in La Tronche where the Assize Court had visited a few weeks earlier, using a plan drawn by himself. Matencio's letter was sent to the public prosecutor, who immediately informed the missing woman's family and launched a new search at this location. On 5 January 1982, a new search was carried out at the location indicated by Matencio from his cell and led to the discovery of Olga's remains, buried in an embankment a few metres from Matencio's indications. The personal effects found at the scene were recognised by the young woman's relatives.

With regard to the murder of Yves Marin-Laflèche, Matencio, Le Sant and Calvy, who has since been released, are still charged by the Lyon public prosecutor's office. This delay is linked in particular to Matencio's crimes, suggesting that he was not necessarily a stranger to this crime, whose sole motive appears to be financial. At the same time, Matencio was transferred to the Maison d'arrêt de Fresnes, a prison for people serving long sentences. On 5 February 1985, Matencio, Le Sant and Calvy were acquitted of the Marin-Laflèche murder.

=== Health problems and final years in prison ===
On 8 December 1995, Matencio suffered a stroke at the Fresnes prison. He was rushed in a coma to the prison hospital for treatment. He was given medication and occupational therapy. Placed in an induced coma, his prognosis remains life-threatening. His lawyer, Paul Riquier, requested his release on medical grounds, but his request was rejected. In a letter written on 26 September 1996, Mr Riquier requested that Matencio be transferred to the Maison Centrale de Poissy, stressing the presence of the prisoner's family and friends in the region and the fact that the prison had cells better suited to disabled prisoners.

At the beginning of 1997, the judge responsible for individualising detention regimes examined the request made by Matencio's lawyers and granted his transfer to another prison. In April, Matencio was transferred to the Maison Centrale de Poissy. After sixteen months in hospital, Matencio was suffering from the serious after-effects of his stroke, including monoplegia of the right upper limb, monoparesis of the right lower limb, dysarthria and vertigo. An application for release was then lodged, based on Matencio's degree of incapacity. In a report issued on 19 September 1997, the Commission technique d'orientation et de reclassement professionnel (COTOREP) found Matencio to be 80% incapacitated. However, the sentence enforcement judge refused to release Matencio, deeming his health compatible with his detention.

On 7 September 1999, the head doctor of the prison health unit (UCSA) at the Poissy prison drew up a certificate describing Matencio's neurological after-effects, which had regressed to a very limited extent, highlighting a deterioration in his compliance with treatment and leading to an irregularity in his medication intake, causing a worsening of his condition as well as epileptic seizures. According to him, Matencio's state of health appears to have stabilised, with an autonomy enabling him to take care of the daily routine of life, his hygiene, his diet and his ability to read and write. The application for release was therefore rejected. On 8 March 2000, Matencio and Me Riquier appealed to the European Court of Human Rights (ECHR), claiming that the treatment Matencio was receiving in detention was incompatible with his state of health and that he was no longer fit to continue in detention.

On 2 February 2001, Matencio was rushed to hospital at the Maison Centrale de Poissy after feeling unwell. He was saved at the last minute, but his health had deteriorated considerably. A new application for Matencio's release was lodged on 22 June, based on the prisoner's condition and the after-effects of his stroke and illness, which rendered him unfit for further detention. In addition to Matencio's health, Paul Riquier emphasised that he was no longer at risk of re-offending, as his health made him virtually incapable of physical movement. On 26 November, the regional court of the Versailles Court of Appeal accepted Matencio's application for conditional release, pointing to his organic repercussions, a degree of incapacity of 80% and the care from which he could no longer benefit in prison.

=== Release, ECHR decision and end of life ===
Matencio was released on 14 December 2001, after 25 years in prison. He was 53 years old at the time and - taking into account all his incarcerations - had spent half his life in prison.

At the same time as Matencio's release, the Kouchner law, passed on 4 March 2002, provided for the possibility of suspending the sentence, regardless of the nature of the sentence or the length of time remaining to be served, for convicts suffering from a life-threatening condition or their state of health being permanently incompatible with continued detention. On 7 November, the European Court of Human Rights examined the application concerning the incompatibility of Matencio's treatment, lodged on 8 March 2000, and ruled in favour of all the parties' arguments, declaring the application admissible.

The final decision was handed down on 15 January 2004, finding the authorities at fault for failing to provide Matencio with the care he needed, from September 1999 until his release on 14 December 2001, that would have enabled him to avoid treatment contrary to article 3 of the convention, which stipulates that no one shall be subjected to torture.

In April 2009, false information and publications falsely claimed that Matencio had died in 2002, in the months following his release from prison. These arguments were based in particular on his health at the time of his release and the fact that he lived in total privacy, giving way to the spread of fake news. These rumours were entirely dismissed in January 2018 during a podcast on the Hondelatte raconte programme, presented by Christophe Hondelatte, reporting on the so-called ‘Groupe 666’ affair.

Matencio devoted his last years to poetry, writing and publishing numerous poems under the pseudonym Descamino. He died on 24 January 2022, aged 73, in the 14th arrondissement of Paris.

== See also ==
- List of French serial killers
