= Marennes =

Marennes may refer to two communes in France:

- Marennes, Charente-Maritime, in the Nouvelle-Aquitaine region
- Marennes, Rhône, in the Auvergne-Rhône-Alpes region
