= Yves Blein =

French politician (born 1954)

Member of the National Assembly for Rhône's 14th constituency
- In office 20 June 2012 – 22 June 2022
- Preceded by: André Gerin
- Succeeded by: Idir Boumertit

Mayor of Feyzin
- In office 25 March 2001 – 8 July 2017
- Preceded by: Angèle Orard
- Succeeded by: Murielle Laurent

Personal details
- Born: 12 October 1954 (age 71) Lyon, France
- Party: Socialist Party; La République En Marche!

Yves Blein (born 12 October 1954 in Lyon) is a French politician from the department of Rhône. He is a Member of Parliament representing La République En Marche! after being elected to the French National Assembly in Rhône's 14th constituency on 18 June 2017

== See also ==
- 2017 French legislative election
