= Murielle Laurent =

French politician of the Socialist Party (born 1977)

Murielle Laurent MEP
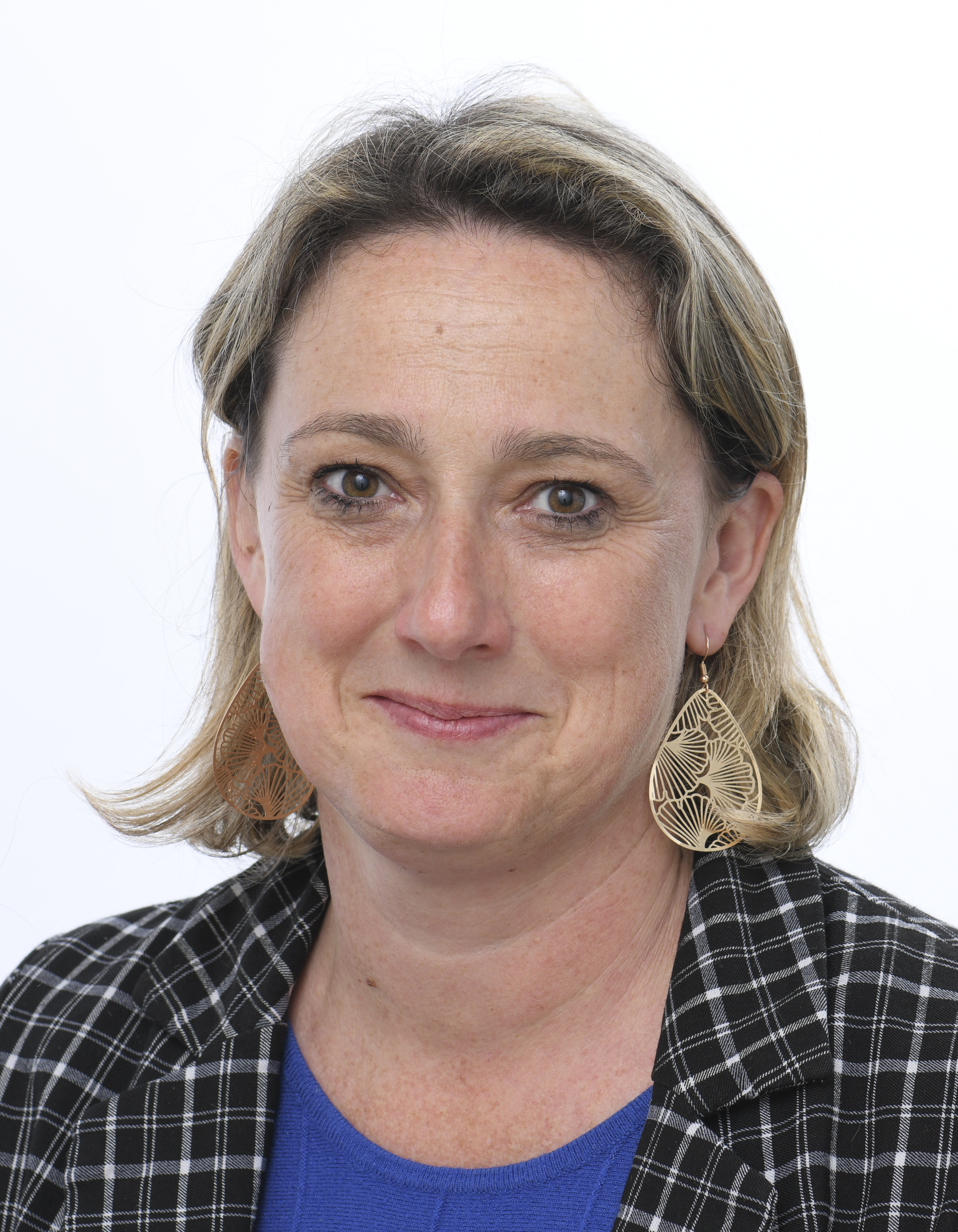

Member of the European Parliament for France
- Incumbent
- Assumed office 16 July 2024

Mayor of Feyzin
- In office 8 July 2017 – 8 July 2024
- Preceded by: Yves Blein
- Succeeded by: Marc Mamet

Personal details
- Born: 21 September 1977 (age 48)
- Party: Socialist Party
- Other political affiliations: Party of European Socialists

Murielle Laurent (born 21 September 1977) is a French politician of the Socialist Party who was elected member of the European Parliament in 2024.

== Political career ==
Laurent served as mayor of Feyzin from 2017 to 2024.

In parliament, Laurent has been serving on the Committee on Civil Liberties, Justice and Home Affairs, the Committee on Development and the Committee on Petitions. In addition to her committee assignments, she is part of the parliament’s delegations for relations with the Mashriq countries, to the OACPS-EU Joint Parliamentary Assembly and to the Caribbean-EU Parliamentary Assembly.
