= Gabriel Montcharmont =

French politician (1940–2019)

Member of the National Assembly for Rhône's 11th constituency
- In office 12 June 1988 – 1 April 1993
- Preceded by: Marie-Josèphe Sublet
- Succeeded by: Jean-Claude Bahu
- In office 1 June 1997 – 18 June 2002
- Preceded by: Jean-Claude Bahu
- Succeeded by: Georges Fenech

Personal details
- Born: 7 April 1940 Autun, France
- Died: 15 January 2019 (aged 78) Condrieu, France
- Party: Socialist Party

Gabriel Montcharmont (7 April 1940 – 15 January 2019) was a French politician.
