= SPSE =

SPSE can refer to:

- Société du pipeline sud-européen, operator of a crude oil pipeline in France, Switzerland and Germany
- Society of Photographic Scientists and Engineers, a former name for the Society for Imaging Science and Technology (IS&T)
- Society of Professionals, Scientists and Engineers, union representing some University of California staff at the Lawrence Livermore National Laboratory
- South Pacific Stock Exchange, a stock exchange based in Suva, Fiji
- Southern Pump Services Engineering, pump manufacturer in Perivale, United Kingdom
- Syndicat du personnel de soutien en éducation, labour union that forms part of the Centrale des syndicats du Québec in Canada
- Sistem Pengadaan Secara Elektronik, a nationwide Electronic Government Procurement System of Government of Indonesia
- Stowarzyszenie Pasjonatów Sportów Elektronicznych, Polska organizacja pozarządowa, działająca w obszarze e-sportu.
- SharePoint Server Subscription Edition, a Microsoft collaboration product.
