= Feyzin Refinery =

Oil Refinery in SE France

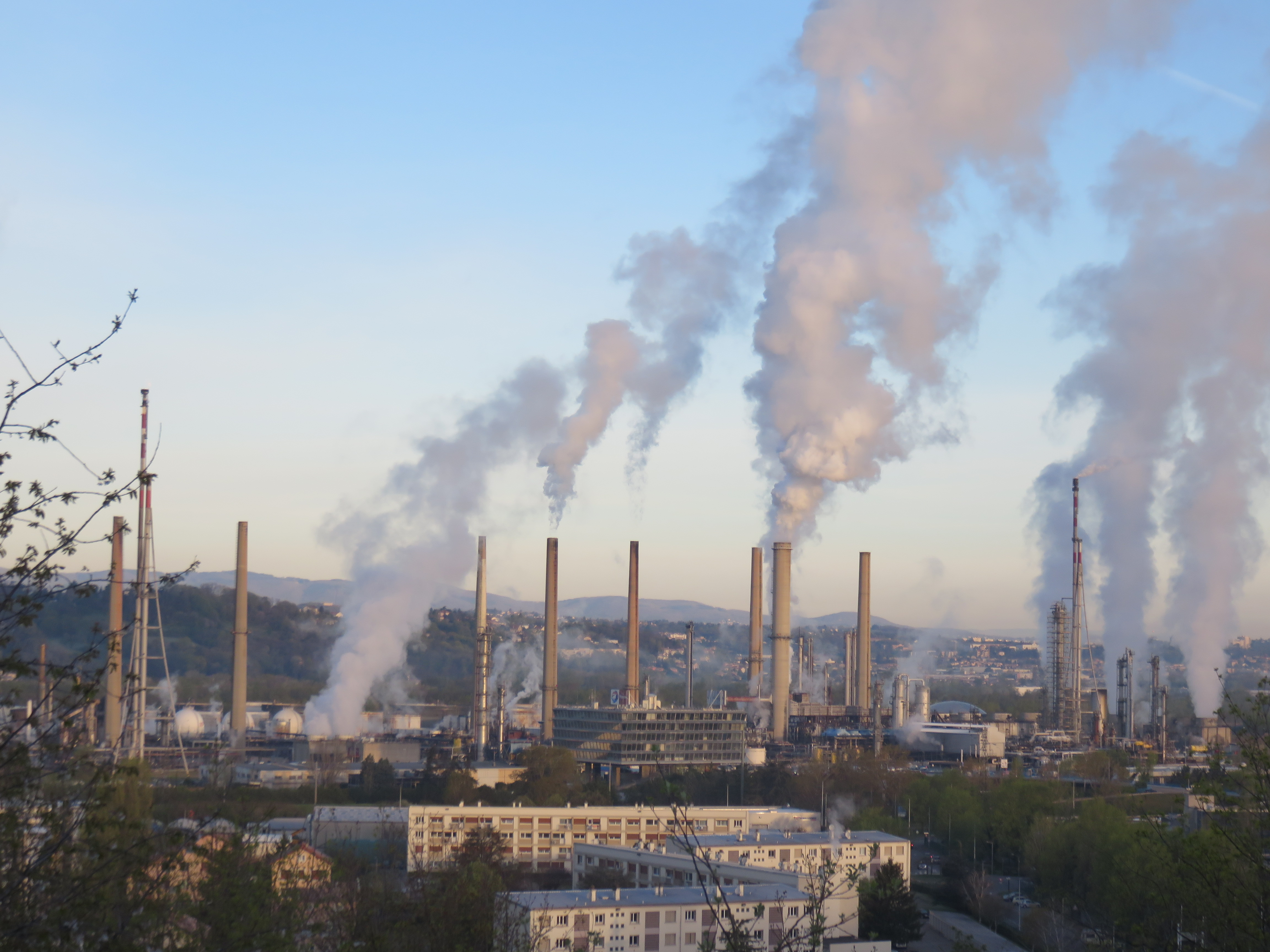
- View in April 2019

- Location within France
- Location: France; 45.674°N 4.844°E

Refinery details
- Owner: TotalEnergies
- Opened: 15 October 1964
- No. of employees: 500

The Feyzin Refinery (Raffinerie de Feyzin) is an oil refinery in south-east France, one of six oil refineries in France.

== History ==
Until 1964 most of the petrol in France was refined by British or American companies. A law was passed on 28 February 1963 declaring that at least 20% of the petrol refined in France had to have French involvement, by imposing import quotas. The state-owned l'Union générale des pétroles (UGP) was formed on 19 June 1960.

By 1965 France was refining around 70m tonnes of oil per year. Elf Aquitaine was formed on 27 April 1967. Elf merged with ERAP in 1976, then merged with Total in 2003.

=== Construction ===
Work started April 1963, with the first products made in June 1964.

It opened on 15 October 1964, owned by UGP. It could process 6,000 tonnes per day with 2m tonnes of products a year It cost 250m francs, which was 75% funded by the state.

=== Explosion in January 1966 ===
The Feyzin disaster was on 4 January 1966.

Oil refineries in France

== Structure ==
It is on the South European Pipeline, built in 1962 by the Société du pipeline sud-européen (founded in 1958), with an extension first proposed in April 1970.
