= Rhône's 14th constituency =

Constituency of the National Assembly of France

14th constituency of Rhône
- inline Constituency of the National Assembly of France

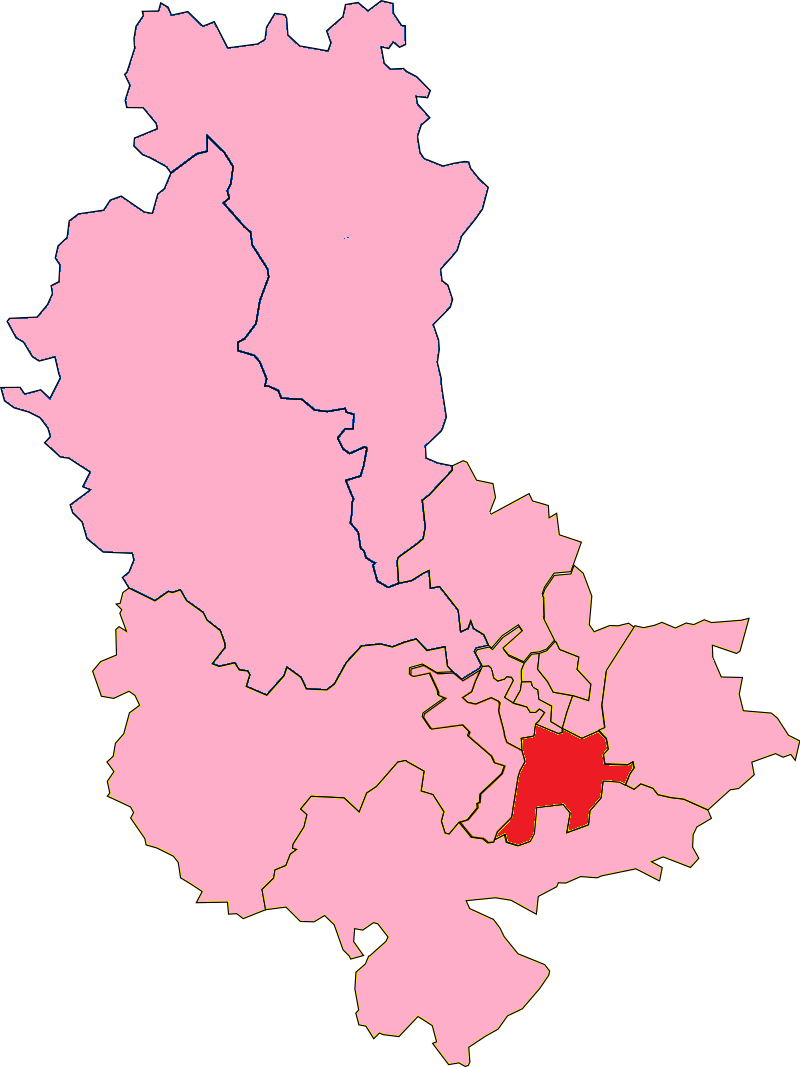
- Rhône's's 14th Constituency shown within the Rhône
- Deputy: Idir Boumertit; LFI
- Department: Rhône
- Cantons: Saint-Fons, Vénissieux Nord, Vénissieux Sud, Saint-Priest (part)
- Registered voters: 84804

The 14th constituency of the Rhône (French: Quatorzième circonscription du Rhône) is a French legislative constituency in the Rhône département. Like the other 576 French constituencies, it elects one MP using a two round electoral system.

== Description ==
The 14th constituency of the Rhône lies to the south east of Lyon forming part of the greater urban conglomeration. It contains the large town of Vénissieux as well as those parts of Saint-Priest not included in Rhône's 13th constituency.

The seat has a strong left wing tradition having been represented by a Communist Party deputy for many years. At the 2017 election the incumbent PS deputy switched to En Marche. He subsequently easily held the seat in the face of a second round challenge by the National Front. The seat swung back to the left in 2022, when La France Insoumise gained the seat as part of the NUPES alliance.

== Assembly Members ==
Election	Member	Party
1988	Marie-Josèphe Sublet	PS
1993	André Gerin	PCF
1997	André Gerin	PCF
2002	André Gerin	PCF
2007	André Gerin	PCF
2012	Yves Blein	PS
2017	Yves Blein	LREM
2022	Idir Boumertit	LFI
2024	Idir Boumertit	LFI

== Election results ==
=== 2024 ===
Legislative Election 2024: Rhône's 14th constituency
Party	Candidate	Votes	%	±%
LFI (NFP)	Idir Boumertit	21,854	48.78	+13.02
LR	David Mazzone	2,059	4.60	N/A
RN	Cédric Mermet	12,637	28.21	+6.50
LO	Olivier Minoux	815	1.82	N/A
RE (Ensemble)	Ludovic Almeras	6,996	15.62	−9.85
REC	Blandine Riha	437	0.98	−4.40
Turnout		44,798	97.83	+61.50
Registered electors		76,572		
2nd round result
LFI	Idir Boumertit	26,974	65.03	+8.34
RN	Cédric Mermet	14,508	34.97	N/A
Turnout		41,482	92.56	+58.09
Registered electors		76,602		
LFI hold		Swing		

=== 2022 ===
Legislative Election 2022: Rhone's 14th constituency
Party	Candidate	Votes	%	±%
LFI (NUPÉS)	Idir Boumertit	9,626	35.76	+3.26
LREM (Ensemble)	Yves Blein	6,857	25.47	-10.53
RN	Damien Monchau	5,846	21.71	+4.10
REC	Bruno Attal	1,449	5.38	N/A
DVE	Camila Salmi	697	2.59	N/A
Others	N/A	2,447	-	−
Turnout		26,922	36.33	+0.94
2nd round result
LFI (NUPÉS)	Idir Boumertit	13,798	56.69	N/A
LREM (Ensemble)	Yves Blein	10,540	43.31	−22.29
Turnout		24,338	34.47	+6.32
LFI gain from LREM				

=== 2017 ===
Legislative Election 2017: Rhône's 14th constituency
Party	Candidate	Votes	%	±%
LREM	Yves Blein	9,463	36.00	
FN	Damien Monchau	4,629	17.61	
LFI	Benjamin Nivard	3,835	14.59	
PCF	Michèle Picard	2,746	10.45	
UDI	Maurice Iacovella	1,852	7.05	
PS	Adrien Drioli	1,109	4.22	
EELV	Véronique Giromagny	852	3.24	
DLF	Franck Muller	570	2.17	
Others	N/A	1,232		
Turnout		26,288	35.39	
2nd round result
LREM	Yves Blein	13,714	65.60	
FN	Damien Monchau	7,192	34.40	
Turnout		20,906	28.15	
LREM gain from PS				

=== 2012 ===
Legislative Election 2012: Rhône's 14th constituency
Party	Candidate	Votes	%	±%
PS	Yves Blein	12,461	37.03	
FN	Sandrine Ligout	7,269	21.60	
UMP	Christophe Girard	5,866	17.43	
FG	Michèle Picard	4,612	13.70	
EELV	Zafer Girisit	1,015	3.02	
MoDem	Saliha Mertani	735	2.18	
Others	N/A	1,696		
Turnout		33,654	47.98	
2nd round result
PS	Yves Blein	19,776	62.00	
FN	Sandrine Ligout	12,119	38.00	
Turnout		31,895	45.47	
PS gain from PCF				

=== 2007 ===
Legislative Election 2007: Rhône's 14th constituency
Party	Candidate	Votes	%	±%
UMP	Michel Denis	7,595	29.92	
PCF	André Gerin	5,708	22.49	
PS	Yves Blein	4,577	18.03	
MoDem	Seliha Mertani	1,976	7.78	
FN	Yvan Benedetti	1,645	6.48	
MPF	Christophe Girard	816	3.21	
LV	Geneviève Soudan	720	2.84	
Others	N/A	2,348		
Turnout		25,813	51.29	
2nd round result
PCF	André Gerin	13,574	53.85	
UMP	Michel Denis	11,631	46.15	
Turnout		26,058	51.77	
PCF hold				

=== 2002 ===
Legislative Election 2002: Rhône's 14th constituency
Party	Candidate	Votes	%	±%
PCF	André Gerin	8,569	32.36	
UMP	Andre Sardat	5,801	21.91	
FN	Liliane Boury	5,166	19.51	
LV	Ahmed Benferhat	1,354	5.11	
DVD	Andree Richard	1,353	5.11	
DVG	Michele Edery	1,298	4.90	
LCR	Francoise Chalons	678	2.56	
PR	Martine Souvignet	554	2.09	
Others	N/A	1,704		
Turnout		27,010	57.97	
2nd round result
PCF	André Gerin	11,942	53.04	
UMP	Andre Sardat	10,574	46.96	
Turnout		23,581	50.61	
PCF hold				

=== 1997 ===
Legislative Election 1997: Rhône's 14th constituency
Party	Candidate	Votes	%	±%
PCF	André Gerin	8,556	29.38	
FN	Richard Morati	7,194	24.70	
PS	Réjane Ariagno-Baroche	4,649	15.96	
RPR	Andre Sardat	4,554	15.64	
LV	Paul Coste	1,214	4.17	
LO	Jean-Pierre Tardy	1,091	3.75	
GE	Gaêtane Notargiacomo	733	2.52	
Others	N/A	1,130		
Turnout		30,155	64.17	
2nd round result
PCF	André Gerin	17,792	63.67	
FN	Richard Morati	10,153	36.33	
Turnout		30,662	65.25	
PCF hold				
