= History of the petroleum industry in France =

The history of the petroleum industry in France covers the exploitation of petroleum in its relation to the economy of France.

== World War I ==
In 1917, France effectively exhausted its supply of oil, and had to be rescued by the United States. After the war, the French government sought to correct this situation happening again.

The l'Office National des Combustibles liquides was formed in 1925, with an important law passed in 1928.

== Formation of companies ==
On 28 March 1924, the Compagnie Française de Pétrole (CFP) was created, which later formed the subsidiary Compagnie Française de Raffinage (CFR), which became the Total group. These two companies were given responsibility by the French government for Iraqi crude oil due to France.

The Total product of petrol was introduced in 1954, with the company being renamed Total-C.F.P. in 1985.

The Elf group began after World War II. The Union française des industries pétrolières (UFIP) was formed in 1944, the main national French organization for its petroleum industry.

== Creation of a French oil refining company ==
Until the 1960s, France did not have any refineries of its own. For this purpose, the Union Générale des Pétroles (UGP) was formed on 19 June 1960, being formed from the merger of SN REPAL, RAP and the Groupement des Exploitants Petrolièrs (GAP).

UGP owned an oil refining operation at Ambès, built around 1930, which could process around 1.3 million tons per year. UGP had around 183 service stations.

The refining capacity for UGP was not enough for its requirements, so a new refinery was planned - the Feyzin Refinery, which opened in 1964. UGP would buy other refineries around the world, and by the late 1970s it had 22 refineries.

== Formation of a central oil distribution company ==
UGP acquired smaller distribution companies. Running the various distribution companies became unwieldy, so they were merged as the Union générale de distribution (UGD).

== Onshore oil ==
The first onshore oil in France was discovered on 22 February 1958 in Coulommes.

== See also ==
• List of French refineries (French language)
