= Claude La Colombière =

French Jesuit priest and saint (1641–1682)

Saint Claude La Colombière SJ
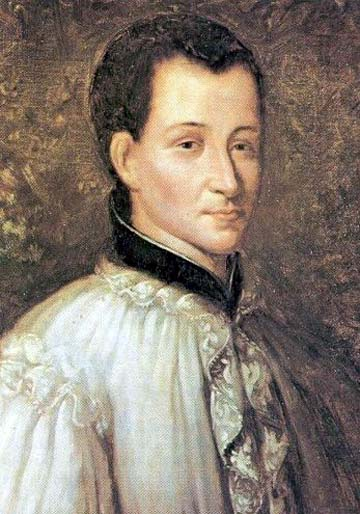

Religious, Priest and Confessor
- Born: 2 February 1641; Saint-Symphorien-d'Ozon, Dauphiné, Kingdom of France
- Died: 15 February 1682 (aged 41); Paray-le-Monial, Duchy of Burgundy, Kingdom of France
- Venerated in: Catholic Church (Society of Jesus)
- Beatified: 16 June 1929, Vatican City, by Pope Pius XI
- Canonized: 31 May 1992, Vatican City, by Pope John Paul II
- Major shrine: Jesuit Church, Paray-le-Monial, Saône-et-Loire, France
- Feast: 15 February
- Patronage: Toymakers, devotion to the Sacred Heart of Jesus

Claude La Colombière, sometimes referred to as Claude de la Colombière, was a French Jesuit priest best known as the confessor of Margaret Mary Alacoque. He is venerated as a saint in the Catholic Church.

== Life ==
=== Early life ===
He was born in 1641 in the city of Saint-Symphorien-d'Ozon, then in the ancient Province of Dauphiné, the third child of the notary Bertrand La Colombière and Margaret Coindat. The family soon moved to the nearby city of Vienne, where he began his education, before attending the Jesuit school in Lyon for his secondary studies.

In 1658, at the age of seventeen, Colombière entered the novitiate of the Society of Jesus at Avignon. He did this despite what he recorded as "a terrible aversion for the life embraced". When he completed the two-year novitiate, he started his higher studies in the same city. He was professed there and completed his studies. After this he spent the next five years of his regency teaching grammar and literature at the same school.

=== Jesuit ministry ===
Colombière was sent to Paris in 1666 to study theology at the College de Clermont. He was also assigned to be the tutor of the children of the Royal Minister of Finances, Jean-Baptiste Colbert. After completing his studies there, he was ordained a priest in 1669 and initially assigned to teach at his former school in Lyon. He then was assigned to join the preaching team of the Jesuit community, through which he gained notice for the clarity and soundness of his sermons.

In 1674, after 15 years of life as a Jesuit, Colombière did his next period of probation known as the tertianship, which was to prove decisive in his life. As a result of this experience of the Spiritual Exercises, he made a personal vow, as a means of attaining the utmost possible perfection, to observe faithfully the Rule and Constitutions of the Society under penalty of sin. Those who lived with him attested that this vow was kept with great exactitude.

=== The Sacred Heart ===
After professing the Fourth Vow of the Society at the end of his tertianship on 2 February 1675, Colombière was appointed the rector of the Jesuit community at Paray-le-Monial, where he also became the spiritual director of the nuns of the Monastery of the Visitation Sisters located next to the church. In this way he came to know Margaret Mary Alacoque. The curiosity of such a promising preacher having been assigned to this remote location has led to the supposition that his superiors had her in mind in making this assignment.

The disbelief of the other religious sisters of her monastery left Alacoque anxious and uncertain. She felt isolated in her situation of having experienced a series of private revelations from Christ in which she felt she was being called to promote devotion to his Sacred Heart. When Colombière came to the community and began to hear the confessions of the sisters, she felt that she had finally found a priest in whom she could truly confide, and opened up her heart to him. She later wrote that she saw that his spiritual gift "was that of bringing souls to God along the Gospel way of love and mercy which Christ revealed to us". After speaking with her a number of times and after much prayer, as a result, he was convinced of the validity of her visions and became both her supporter and a zealous apostle of the devotion.

=== England ===
In 1676 Colombière was sent to England as preacher to Mary of Modena, then the Duchess of York, wife of the future King James II of England. He took up residence at the Court of St. James’s, where he still observed all his religious duties as a member of the Society. He was also as active a preacher and confessor in England as he had been in France. Although encountering many difficulties, he was able to guide Alacoque by letter.

Colombière's zeal and the English climate soon combined to weaken his health and a pulmonary condition threatened to end his work in that country. In November 1678, while awaiting a recall to France, he was suddenly arrested and thrown into prison, denounced as being a part of the Popish Plot alleged by Titus Oates against the English throne. Caught up in the anti-Catholic hysteria which resulted from this alleged plot, he was confined in severe conditions at the King's Bench Prison, where his fragile health took a turn for the worse. He is quoted by the historian John Philipps Kenyon as having described the effects of the situation—in which over 20 Jesuits died—on the Society of Jesus, writing:

"The name of the Jesuit is hated above all else, even by priests both secular and regular, and by the Catholic laity as well, because it is said that the Jesuits have caused this raging storm, which is likely to overthrow the whole Catholic religion".

Thanks to his position at the Royal Court and to the protection of the King of France, Louis XIV, whose subject he was, he escaped death but was expelled from England in 1679. He returned to France with his health ruined by his imprisonment.

=== Death and veneration ===
The last two years of Colombière's life were spent at Lyon, where he was spiritual director to the Jesuit novices, and at Paray-le-Monial, where he returned to improve his health. He died on 15 February 1682.

Colombière left a large number of writings. His principal works, Pious Reflections, Meditations on the Passion, and Retreat and Spiritual Letters, were published under the title, Oeuvres du R.P. Claude La Colombière (Avignon, 1832; Paris, 1864). Pope Francis observes that his absolute confidence in God is "eloquently expressed" in his devotional writings:

“My God, I am so convinced that you keep watch over those who hope in you ..."

Colombière was beatified by Pope Pius XI on 16 June 1929, and the cause for his canonization was opened on 14 November 1934. He was canonized by Pope John Paul II on 31 May 1992. His relics are preserved in the Jesuit Church in Paray-le-Monial.

== See also ==
- Saint news
- Saint Claude La Colombière, patron saint archive
