= Marie-Josèphe Sublet =

French politician

Member of the National Assembly for Rhône's 14th constituency
- In office 13 June 1988 – 1 April 1993
- Preceded by: None
- Succeeded by: André Gerin

Member of the National Assembly for Rhône's 11th constituency
- In office 2 July 1981 – 14 May 1988
- Preceded by: Marcel Houël
- Succeeded by: None

Personal details
- Born: 10 February 1936 Lyon, Auvergne-Rhône-Alpes, France
- Died: 28 January 2024 (aged 87) Feyzin, Auvergne-Rhône-Alpes France
- Party: Socialist Party
- Awards: Knight of the Legion of Honour

Marie-Josèphe Sublet (née Feschet; 10 February 1936 – 28 January 2024) was a French politician of the Socialist Party. She was a municipal councillor of Feyzin from 1965 before becoming mayor of the town from 1977 to 1989, overseeing the town's development through the construction of numerous facilities. Sublet was deputy of Rhône's 11th constituency for the Socialist Party in the National Assembly between 1981 and 1988 and then Rhône's 14th constituency from 1988 to 1993. She was appointed Knight of the Legion of Honour in 1998.

== Early life ==
Sublet was born in the 3rd arrondissement of Lyon on 10 February 1936. She was the oldest of nine siblings. Her mother, Marie Feshet, was a private school teacher and her father, Léopold Feschet, was a chemist at Rhône-Poulenc. The family lived in Saint-Fons, before moving to the town of Feyzin in 1938. Sublet attended the private La Xavière School Centre in Lyon and later at the Lycée de Saint-Just, obtaining her baccalauréat in experimental sciences. She later enrolled at the Ecole Technique, Lyon.

== Career ==
Sublet began her working career as a chemist's assistant and physicist at the physics-chemistry laboratory of Rhône-Poulenc, close to the refinery in Feyzin. She changed profession to work as a family worker with troubled families before being appointed director of the grouping of six home and family support associations, which took the name of Departmental Interfederal Association for Family Assistance (ADIAF) from 1972 to 1982. Sublet was also appointed director of Orlec (Regional Leisure and Culture Organization) in the 1970s, organising travel camps for disadvantaged youth, and was an activist in the Catholic youth movement. She was a member of the French Section of the Workers' International, the French Democratic Confederation of Labour (CFDT) and the Socialist Party.

In 1965, Sublet was elected municipal councillor of Feyzin and had two terms as mayor of Feyzin in a socialist-communist from 1977 to 1989, the first woman to hold the office. She was a supporter of the development of the town through the construction of numerous facilities such as the Léonard de Vinci Center, the Community Leisure Center (Les 3 Cerisiers), tennis courts, a bowling alley, and a building housing the Media Library. At the 1981 French legislative election that June, Sublet was elected deputy of Rhône's 11th constituency for the Socialist Party in the National Assembly, winning re-election in 1986 and 1988, the latter to the newly created Rhône's 14th constituency. She lost her seat at the 1993 French legislative election, losing to André Gerin of the French Communist Party. In parliament, she focused on arbitration, employment law, quality of life, social problems and women's rights. Sublet was vice-president of the France–Republic of Chile friendship group and was on the Commission for Cultural, Family and Social Affairs. She was secretary of the National Assembly from June 1988 to April 1991.

After leaving parliament, Sublet became more involved at the union level within retires of the CFDT, working to implement the Personalized Autonomy Allowance. She was president of the Des fleurs et des arts association in Feyzin that promoted floral art. In 1998, Sublet was appointed Knight of the Legion of Honour. She was a member of the Human Rights League.

== Personal life ==
She was a Roman Catholic. Sublet married the agricultural technician Bernard Sublet in December 1960. He died in a car accident the following month. Sublet died in Feyzin on 28 January 2024. Her funeral took place at Feyzin Church on 6 February.
