= Simandres =

- Commune
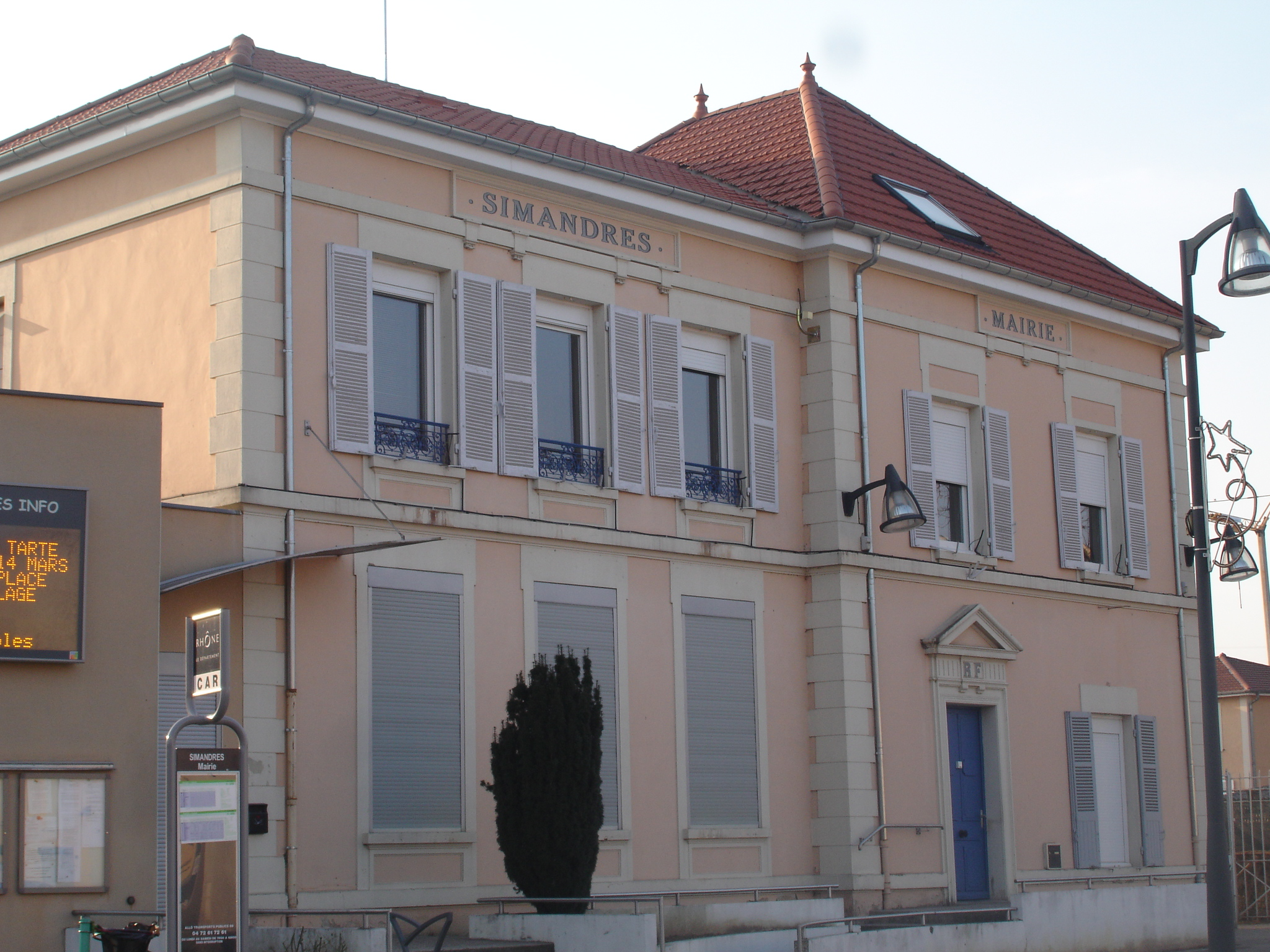
- The town hall in Simandres

- Coat of arms
- Location of Simandres
- Location within France Location within Auvergne-Rhône-Alpes
- Coordinates: 45°37′14″N 4°52′26″E
- Country: France
- Region: Auvergne-Rhône-Alpes
- Department: Rhône
- Arrondissement: Lyon
- Canton: Saint-Symphorien-d'Ozon

Government
  - Mayor (2020–2026): Michel Boulud
- Area^{1}: 10.45 km^{2} (4.03 sq mi)
- Elevation: 250 m (820 ft)
- Highest elevation: 377 m (1,237 ft)
- Lowest elevation: 178 m (584 ft)
- Population (2023): 1,918
  - Density: 183.5/km^{2} (475.4/sq mi)
- Time zone: UTC+01:00 (CET)
  - Summer (DST): UTC+02:00 (CEST)
- INSEE/Postal code: 69295 /69360
- ^{1} French Land Register data, which excludes lakes, ponds, glaciers > 1 km^{2} (0.386 sq mi or 247 acres) and river estuaries.

Simandres (French pronunciation: [simɑ̃dʁ]) is a commune in the Rhône department in eastern France.

== See also ==
- Communes of the Rhône department
