= Feyzin disaster =

1966 fire in a refinery in France

Coordinates: 45.6731°N 4.8589°E

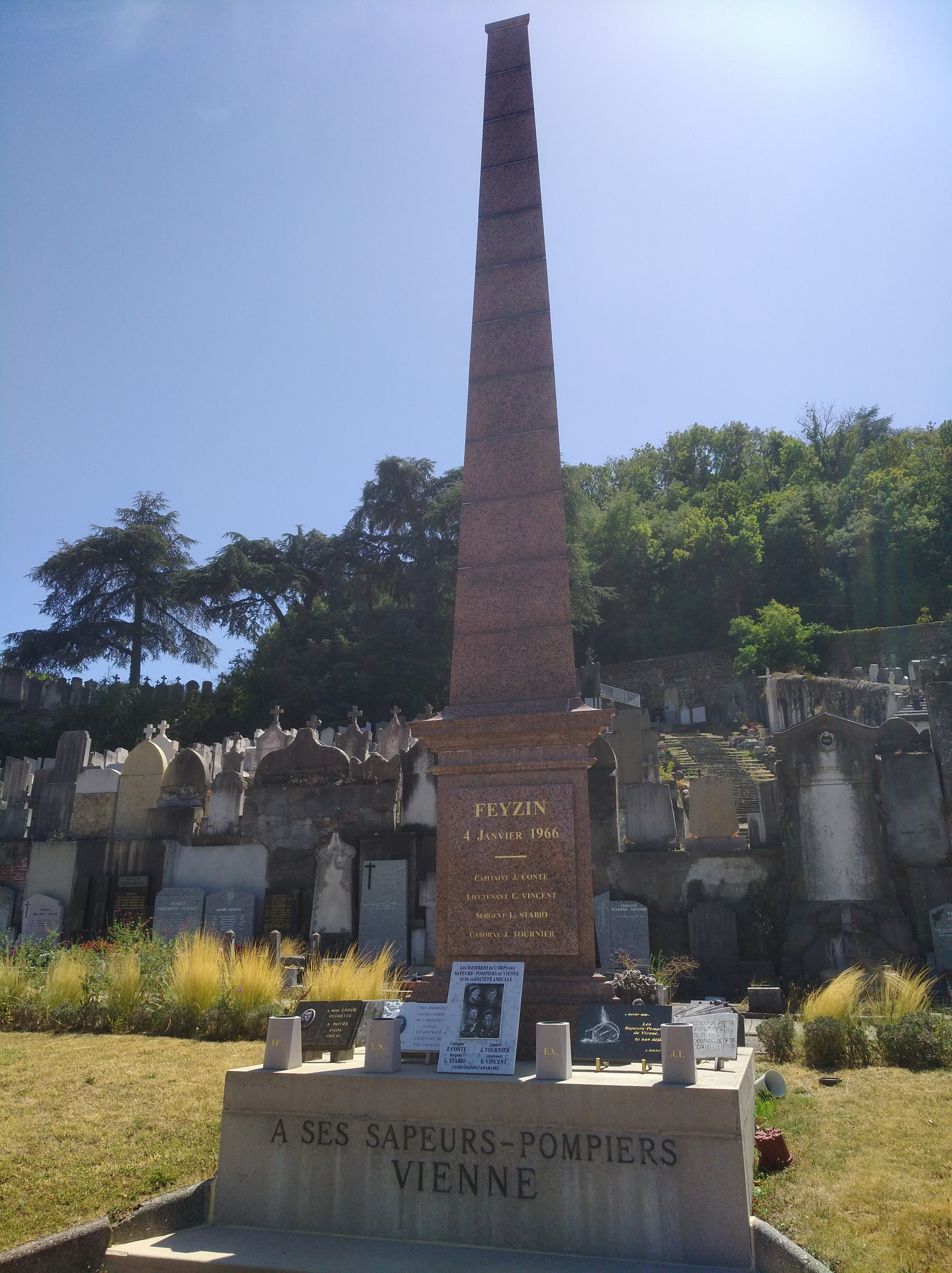
Memorial to the 1966 Feyzin refinery accident in the Pipet cemetery in Vienne (Isère).

The Feyzin disaster occurred in a refinery near the town of Feyzin, 10 kilometres (6 miles) south of Lyon, France, on 4 January 1966. An LPG spill occurred when an operator was draining water from a 1,200m³ pressurised propane tank. The resultant cloud of propane vapour spread, until it was ignited by a car on an adjoining road. The pool of propane on the road caused the storage tank to be engulfed in flames, which produced a Boiling Liquid Expanding Vapour Explosion (BLEVE) when the tank ruptured. This resulted in a fireball which killed and injured firemen and spectators. Flying missiles broke the legs of an adjacent sphere which later BLEVE'd. Three further spheres toppled due to the collapse of support legs which were not adequately fire protected. These vessels ruptured but did not explode. A number of petrol and crude oil tanks also caught fire. The conflagration took 48 hours to bring under control. This incident resulted in the deaths of 18 people, the injury of 81 and extensive damage to the site.

== Prior to the incident ==
The Feyzin Refinery (run by Elf, now acquired by Total), employed around 250 personnel at the time of the incident and had a processing capacity of about 2 million tons of crude oil annually (40,000 barrels per day, approximately). The main refinery units were located to the north of a local road.

The main storage areas were situated to the south of this road in a 145m wide strip adjacent to a boundary fence with a motorway. This was the area in which the disaster occurred.

The equipment in this area consisted of:

- Four 1,200m^{3} spherical vessels used for propane storage
- Four 2,000m^{3} pressure vessels used for propane storage
- Two 150m^{3} horizontal bullet pressure vessels used for propane and butane
- Ten 2,500m^{3} and 6500m^{3} floating roof tanks used for the storage of finished grade petrol and kerosene

The LPG (liquefied petroleum gas) storage spheres were about 450m (1,500 feet) away from the nearest refinery unit and about 300 m (1,000 feet) from the nearest houses in the village. The shortest distance between an LPG sphere and the motorway was 42.4m (138 feet), and the spacings between individual spheres varied from 11.3m (37 feet) to 17.2m (56 feet). Each of the spheres were provided with fixed water sprays both at the top and at the mid-height, plus an additional single spray directed towards the bottom connections.

== The explosion ==
During the 6 am to 2 pm shift at the factory, workers were required to take a routine sample from each of the LPG storage tanks. A team composed of a plant operator, the shift fireman and a laboratory technician were taking a sample from sphere No. 443. The operator, due to the fact that he had only a single valve spanner, opened the valves in the incorrect order. This caused the release of a small amount of caustic soda and a small amount of gas when he opened the lower valve. This prompted the operator to close the valve and then reopen it, leading to only a few drops emerging. The upper valve was then opened fully. This led to a very powerful jet of propane to rush out. This release splashed up from the drain and gave frost burns to the operator on the face and forearm. As he recoiled from the flow, the operator partly pulled off the valve handle. The fireman, losing sight of the operator, turned on the water supply to the sprays fitted to the sphere and, with the operator, attempted to reposition the valve handle and shut the valve. They failed to do so.

The time was now approximately 06:40. The three workers then set off on foot to sound the alarm and seek help (they were afraid of using the telephone or starting up the truck that transported them there in case they set fire to the escaping gas). They were successful in raising the alarm, and traffic was stopped on the nearby motorway. However, the escaping gas ignited.

The fire services attended the blaze, but they were not trained in controlling that type of BLEVE fire. While they attempted to cool the surrounding gas spheres, the leaking sphere exploded, killing several firemen. The explosion also caused other spheres to topple and leak gas.

== Lessons from Feyzin ==
The Feyzin disaster was the worst accident which had occurred in petroleum and petrochemical plants in Western Europe, prior to the Flixborough disaster in 1974. Since then, many pressurised tanks containing liquefied gases have BLEVE'd. The hazards are now better understood and storage spheres are protected from fire engulfment by better design. This and other events like it led to a change in firefighting philosophy - since many firemen and emergency servicemen have been killed while trying to control large fires the cautious philosophy is to evacuate and take shelter until the material burns itself out. BLEVE's produce intense thermal radiation from the fireball. This and blast damage from the bursting pressure vessel are relatively localised compared with unconfined vapour cloud explosions. Therefore, evacuation of up to 0.5 km will usually ensure people's safety. Burning hydrocarbon storage vessels are very spectacular but unpredictable. Therefore, newsmen and sightseers must be kept well away for their own safety.
