= South European Pipeline =

Oil pipeline in France, Switzerland, and Germany

- Map of South European Pipeline

Location
- Country: France; Switzerland; Germany
- Coordinates: 43°27′45″N 4°54′52″E
- Direction: south–north
- Start: Fos-sur-Mer, France
- Passes through: Strasbourg
- To: Karlsruhe; Oberhoffen-sur-Moder; Feyzin

General information
- Type: Crude oil
- Owner: Société du pipeline sud-européen
- Commissioned: 1962; 1971–1972

Technical information
- Length: 1,848 km (1,148 mi)
- Maximum discharge: 23 million metric tons per year
- Diameter: 34 in (864 mm)
- No. of pumping stations: 12

The South European Pipeline (also known as Lavera–Karlsruhe pipeline; French: Pipeline sud-européen) is a crude oil pipeline system in France, Switzerland, and Germany. It is built and operated by Société du pipeline sud-européen. The system supplies crude oil to refineries in Feyzin, Cressier, Reichstett, and Karlsruhe.

== Technical description ==
The main 769-kilometre-long (478 mi) 34-inch (860 mm) pipeline starts in Fos-sur-Mer (Lavera) in France and runs through Strasbourg to Karlsruhe in Germany. It became operational in 1962–1963. As of 2011 it is inactive as the Fos–Strasbourg section is mothballed. Another 714-kilometre-long (444 mi) 40-inch (1,000 mm) pipeline runs from Fos to Strasbourg (Oberhoffen-sur-Moder), and 260-kilometre-long (160 mi) 24-inch (610 mm) pipeline runs from Fos to Lyon (Feyzin). These pipelines became operational in 1971–1972. The system uses twelve pumping stations. The maximum discharge of the system is 35 million metric tons per year, although the real used annual amount is approximately 23 million metric tons per year.

== Accidents ==
In August 2009, a breach in the pipeline led to crude oil spilling into Réserve naturelle nationale des Coussouls de Crau, a nature reserve in France.

== See also ==
- Transalpine Pipeline
