= Montagny, Rhône =

Montagny
- Commune
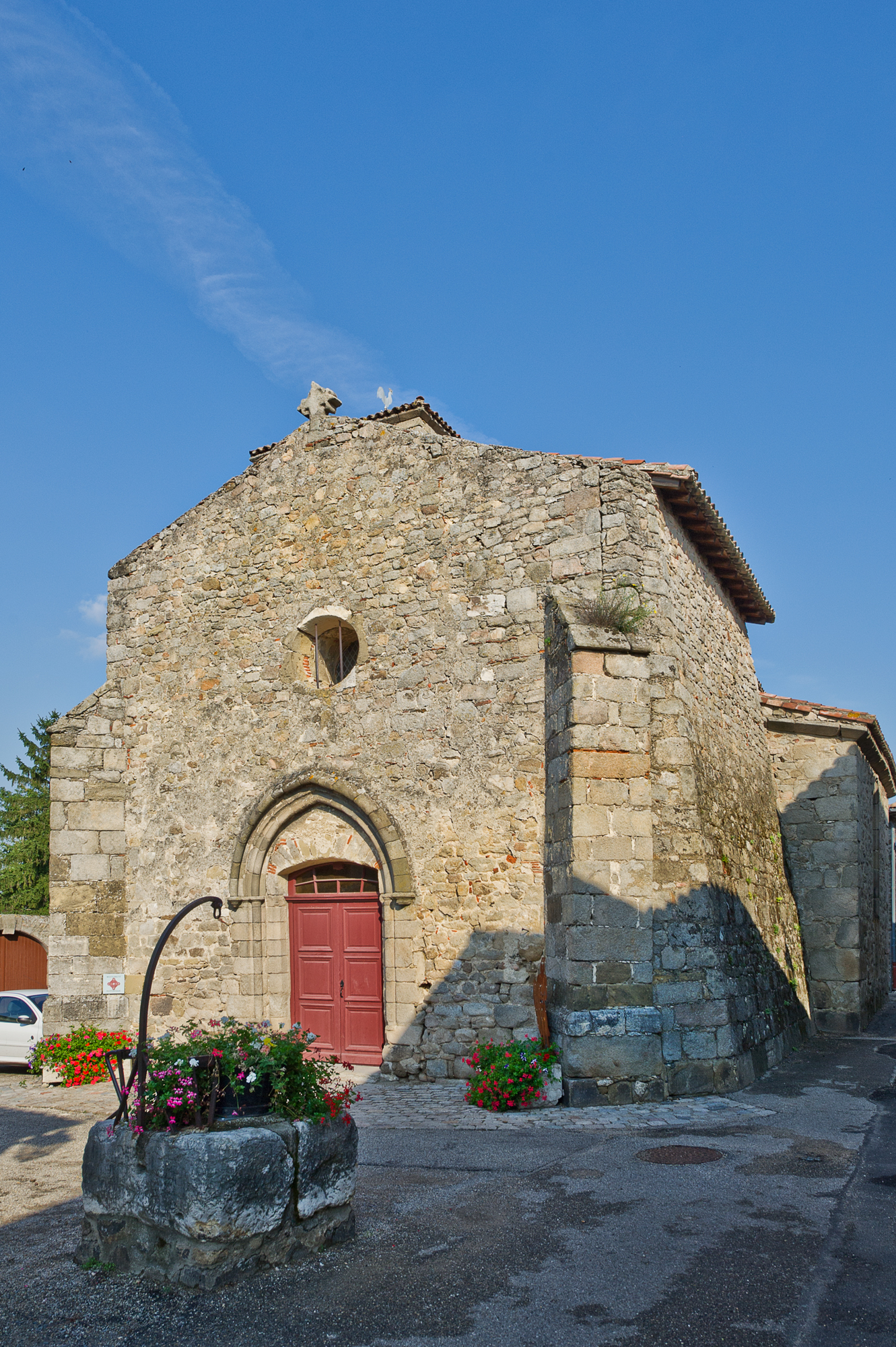
- The church in Montagny

- Coat of arms
- Location of Montagny
- Location within France Location within Auvergne-Rhône-Alpes
- Coordinates: 45°37′44″N 4°44′55″E
- Country: France
- Region: Auvergne-Rhône-Alpes
- Department: Rhône
- Arrondissement: Lyon
- Canton: Saint-Symphorien-d'Ozon
- Intercommunality: Vallée du Garon

Government
  - Mayor (2020–2026): Pierre Fouilland
- Area^{1}: 8.3 km^{2} (3.2 sq mi)
- Highest elevation: 338 m (1,109 ft)
- Lowest elevation: 163 m (535 ft)
- Population (2023): 3,218
  - Density: 390/km^{2} (1,000/sq mi)
- Time zone: UTC+01:00 (CET)
  - Summer (DST): UTC+02:00 (CEST)
- INSEE/Postal code: 69136 /69700
- ^{1} French Land Register data, which excludes lakes, ponds, glaciers > 1 km^{2} (0.386 sq mi or 247 acres) and river estuaries.

Montagny (French pronunciation: [mɔ̃taɲi]) is a commune in the Rhône department in eastern France.

== Population ==
Historical population
Year	Pop.	±% p.a.
1968	762	—
1975	1,227	+7.04%
1982	1,803	+5.65%
1990	2,202	+2.53%
1999	2,322	+0.59%
2007	2,460	+0.72%
2012	2,604	+1.14%
2017	2,959	+2.59%
2023	3,218	+1.41%
Source: INSEE

== See also ==
- Communes of the Rhône department
