= Idir Boumertit =

French politician (born 1974)

Member of the National Assembly for Rhône's 14th constituency
- Incumbent
- Assumed office 22 June 2022
- Preceded by: Yves Blein
- Parliamentary group: La France Insoumise group

Deputy Mayor of Vénissieux
- In office 18 March 2001 – 1 July 2022

Lyon Metropolitan Councilor
- In office 2 July 2020 – 1 July 2022
- President: Bruno Bernard

Personal details
- Born: 4 October 1974 (age 51) Lyon, France
- Party: PRG (?–2008); PG (since 2008); LFI (since 2016)

Idir Boumertit (born 4 October, 1974 in Lyon) is a French politician and member of La France insoumise (LFI). He has been deputy for the fourteenth constituency of Rhône since 2022.

== Biography ==
A native of the Minguettes district, Vénissieux, Idir Boumertit is a vocational integration advisor and taekwondo coach. He was elected municipal councillor and deputy mayor of Vénissieux (2001-2022) and re-elected in 2008, 2014 and 2020. From 2020 to 2022, he has also been a councillor for the Lyon metropolitan authority, as part of the "Métropole insoumise, résiliente et solidaire" group, where he sits on the Economic Development, Digital, Integration and Employment Commission, and the Urban Planning, Housing and Urban Policy Commission.

Initially a member of the Radical Left Party, he joined the Left Party in 2008.

Approached in spring 2022 by the Union Populaire to represent La France Insoumise in the next elections, Idir Boumertit had declined the proposal. With the creation of the Nouvelle Union Populaire Ecologique et Sociale (NUPES), the nomination of the candidate for the fourteenth constituency of the Rhône was very eventful. Two candidates, Michèle Picard (mayor of Vénissieux and member of the PCF) and journalist Taha Bouhafs of La France insoumise claimed the nomination. Bouhafs was nominated as the official NUPES candidate, but after accusations of sexism and sexual violence were made against him, he was eventually forced to withdraw. Idir Boumertit, deputy mayor of Vénissieux, thus became the new candidate designated by NUPES for the 2022 legislative elections.

In these elections, he came first in the first round, with 35.76% of the votes cast, ahead of incumbent Yves Blein, who ran for the Ensemble group. In the second round, he won the duel with 56.69% of the votes cast.

== See also ==
- List of deputies of the 16th National Assembly of France
- List of deputies of the 17th National Assembly of France
