= Georges Fenech =

French former magistrate and politician (born 1954)

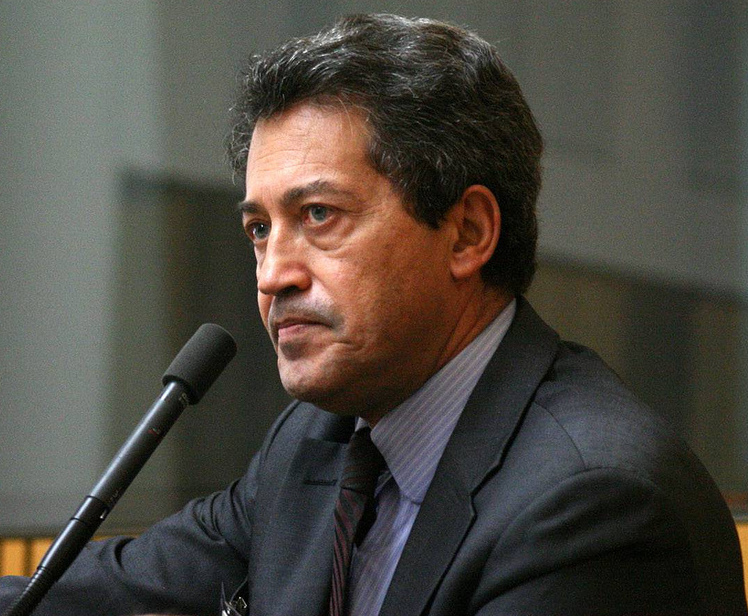
- Georges Fenech in 2011

Member of the National Assembly for Rhône's 11th constituency
- In office 20 June 2012 – 20 June 2017
- Preceded by: Raymond Durand
- Succeeded by: Jean-Luc Fugit
- In office 19 June 2002 – 27 March 2008
- Preceded by: Gabriel Montcharmont
- Succeeded by: Raymond Durand

Personal details
- Born: Georges Vincent Antoine Fenech; 26 October 1954 (age 71) Sousse, Tunisia
- Party: Union for a Popular Movement (until 2015); The Republicans (2015–present)
- Domestic partner: Hermine de Clermont-Tonnerre
- Education: University of Lyon; French National School for the Judiciary
- Profession: Magistrate

Georges Vincent Antoine Fenech (French pronunciation: [ʒɔʁʒ(ə) fənɛk]; born 26 October 1954) is a French former magistrate and politician. A member of The Republicans (LR), he represented the 11th constituency of the Rhône department in the National Assembly from 2002 to 2008 and again from 2012 until 2017. He has been a legal affairs consultant for the CNews television channel since 2017.

== Biography ==
Born to a Maltese father and Italian mother in Sousse in Tunisia, in 1963 Fenech's family was repatriated in France, where they settled in Givors. After studying for a law degree, he started a career as a judge. One of his most high-profile cases was the investigation on the assassination of the judge François Renaud (nicknamed "le shérif" by Lyon's underworld) in Lyon on 3 July 1975. Fenech was the 6th judge to take over this case, and the one who dropped the case for lack of evidence in 1992. He was also in charge of the first case involving Scientology in France.

He started a political career with his 2002 election as a member of the National Assembly (representing the Rhône as a member of Union for a Popular Movement (UMP).

In December 2005, Fenech was a member of the Parliamentary Commission of Enquiry about the Outreau trial (a judicial incident with men and women being held for years in jail on unfounded suspicions), which had been called by President Jacques Chirac in order to help prevent a recurrence of this situation through alterations in France's legal system.

On 28 June 2006, in response to a unanimous resolution of the Law Commission (commission des lois), the French National Assembly unanimously passed a resolution to set up a Parliamentary Commission on Cults in France, about the influence of cultic movements and the consequences of their practices on the physical and mental health of minors. Georges Fenech was appointed President of this commission. The Commission presented its report to the Assembly on 19 December 2006. The report contained 50 recommendations which aimed to protect endangered children.

The same year, he was appointed by Prime Minister Jean-Pierre Raffarin a mission to study the ankle monitor to strengthen the fight against recidivism. An ankle monitor is a device that individuals under house arrest or parole are often required to wear.

On his initiative was created in the French National Assembly a Parliamentary study group on the homelessness, of which he became president. He was appointed draftsman of the Act enforceable right to housing.

Fenech was also a member of the Law Commission, judge of the Law court of the Republic (Cour de Justice de la République), Secretary of the Assemblée parlementaire de la francophonie and member of the Parliamentary study group regarding Tibet issues.

Fenech was re-elected in 2007. On 27 March 2008, the Constitutional Council canceled his reelection on the grounds of violation of campaign finance laws and made him ineligible for one year. However, the Constitutional Council said that the violation was of a formal nature and that the automatic penalty of cancellation might be not appropriate. He protested the decision. Following such cancellation, the Parliament amended the law so that this type of violation does not imply cancellation of the election.

On 23 September 2008, Fenech was appointed by President Nicolas Sarkozy President of MIVILUDES, a body within the French executive in charge of monitoring cults.

Georges Fenech has been reelected from June 2012 as a member of the French Parliament (representing the Rhône as a member of Union for a Popular Movement). He is a member of the Law Commission, President of the parliamentary study group on Cults, member of the National Observatory of Delinquency (Observatoire national de la délinquance et des réponses pénales), Member of the Parliamentary Commission of Enquiry on the role of intelligence service of the French police in the case of French terrorist Mohammed Merah. He is also vice-president of parliamentary relations groups, France-Malta and France-Saudi Arabia.

From March 2014 he is member of Lyon municipal council and metropolitan council.

== Problems with justice ==
Georges Fenech resigned in 1998 from the magistrate union over which he was presiding, after an antisemitic article written by his colleague Alain Terrail in the magistrate union's magazine. As publication director of this magazine, Georges Fenech was found guilty of racial public insults by the 17th chamber of the Parisian Court in November 2000 for having published this article, but without penalty.

In June 2012, he was again found guilty by the 17th chamber of the Parisian Court, for public slander against a Catholic association he had attacked as a "cult" in the annual report of the MIVILUDES. He appealed this decision.

== Bibliography ==
He is the author of books about justice, security, cults and press :

- Main basse sur la justice (1997), Jean-Claude Lattès (8,000 copies)
- La moralisation des Marchés publics (1998)
- Face aux sectes : politiques, justices, État (1999) PUF (2,000 copies)
- Tolérance Zéro. En finir avec la criminalité et les violences urbaines, Grasset (2001) (20,000 copies)
- L'insécurité, Éditions des Syrtes, 2002
- Un juge en colère. En finir avec le juge d'instruction, Éditions du Félin, 2005
- Presse-justice : liaisons dangereuses, L'Archipel, 2007
- La justice face aux dérives sectaires 2008
- Criminels récidivistes : peut-on les laisser sortir ?, Éditions de l'Archipel, 2009
- Apocalypse : menaces imminentes ? Calmann-Lévy, 2012
- Propagande noire, Editions Kero, janvier 2013, co-written with Alexandre Malafaye
- Lettre ouverte à Christiane Taubira, First Document, 2014
