= Taluyers =

- Commune
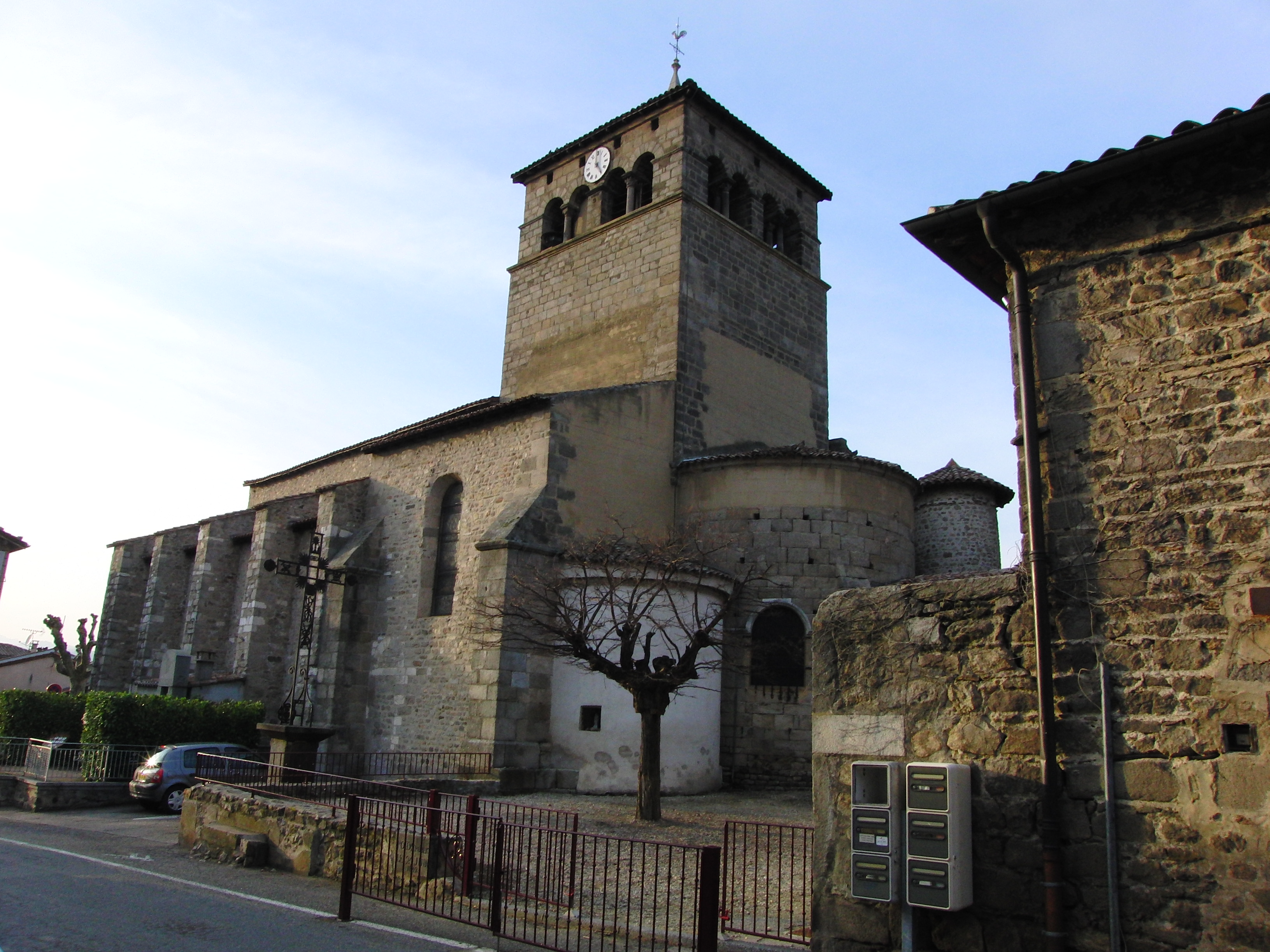
- The church in Taluyers

- Coat of arms
- Location of Taluyers
- Location within France Location within Auvergne-Rhône-Alpes
- Coordinates: 45°38′25″N 4°43′22″E
- Country: France
- Region: Auvergne-Rhône-Alpes
- Department: Rhône
- Arrondissement: Lyon
- Canton: Saint-Symphorien-d'Ozon
- Intercommunality: Pays Mornantais

Government
  - Mayor (2020–2026): Pascal Outrebon
- Area^{1}: 8.09 km^{2} (3.12 sq mi)
- Elevation: 330 m (1,080 ft)
- Highest elevation: 359 m (1,178 ft)
- Lowest elevation: 205 m (673 ft)
- Population (2023): 2,686
  - Density: 332/km^{2} (860/sq mi)
- Time zone: UTC+01:00 (CET)
  - Summer (DST): UTC+02:00 (CEST)
- INSEE/Postal code: 69241 /69440
- ^{1} French Land Register data, which excludes lakes, ponds, glaciers > 1 km^{2} (0.386 sq mi or 247 acres) and river estuaries.

Taluyers is a commune in the Rhône department in eastern France.

== Population ==
Historical population
Year	Pop.	±% p.a.
1968	645	—
1975	844	+3.92%
1982	1,177	+4.87%
1990	1,511	+3.17%
1999	1,870	+2.40%
2007	1,997	+0.82%
2012	2,294	+2.81%
2017	2,539	+2.05%
2023	2,686	+0.94%
Source: INSEE

== See also ==
- Communes of the Rhône department
