= Chaponnay =

- Commune
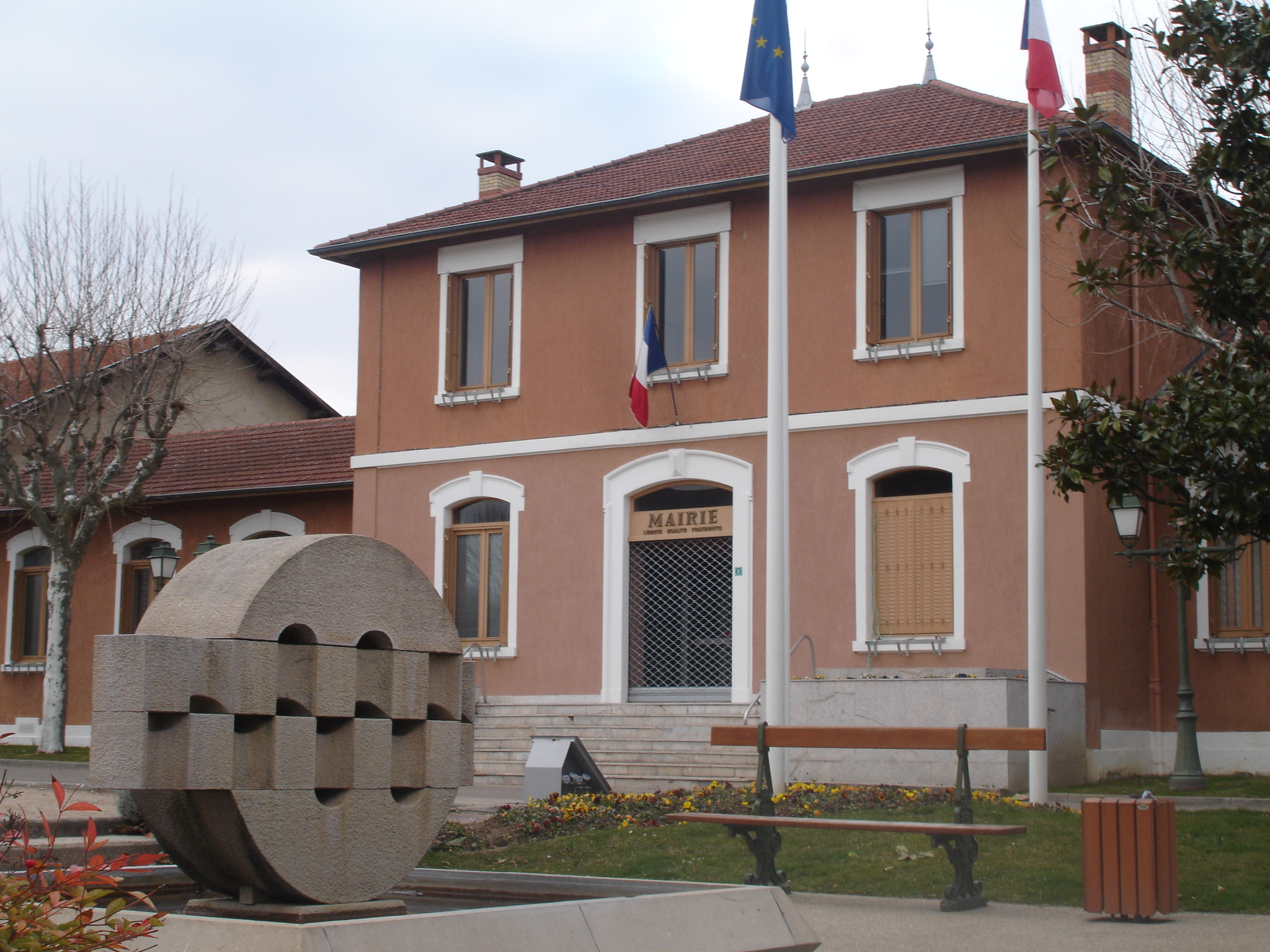
- The town hall in Chaponnay

- Coat of arms
- Location of Chaponnay
- Location within France Location within Auvergne-Rhône-Alpes
- Coordinates: 45°37′42″N 4°56′13″E
- Country: France
- Region: Auvergne-Rhône-Alpes
- Department: Rhône
- Arrondissement: Lyon
- Canton: Saint-Symphorien-d'Ozon

Government
  - Mayor (2020–2026): Raymond Durand
- Area^{1}: 18.89 km^{2} (7.29 sq mi)
- Elevation: 220 m (720 ft)
- Highest elevation: 367 m (1,204 ft)
- Lowest elevation: 192 m (630 ft)
- Population (2023): 4,548
  - Density: 240.8/km^{2} (623.6/sq mi)
- Time zone: UTC+01:00 (CET)
  - Summer (DST): UTC+02:00 (CEST)
- INSEE/Postal code: 69270 /69970
- ^{1} French Land Register data, which excludes lakes, ponds, glaciers > 1 km^{2} (0.386 sq mi or 247 acres) and river estuaries.

Chaponnay (French pronunciation: [ʃapɔnɛ]) is a commune in the Rhône department in eastern France.

== Population ==
Historical population
Year	Pop.	±% p.a.
1968	1,242	—
1975	1,454	+2.28%
1982	2,706	+9.28%
1990	2,913	+0.93%
1999	3,317	+1.45%
2007	3,519	+0.74%
2012	3,805	+1.58%
2017	4,273	+2.35%
2023	4,548	+1.04%
Source: INSEE

== See also ==
Communes of the Rhône department
