= Jean-Luc Fugit =

French politician (born 1969)

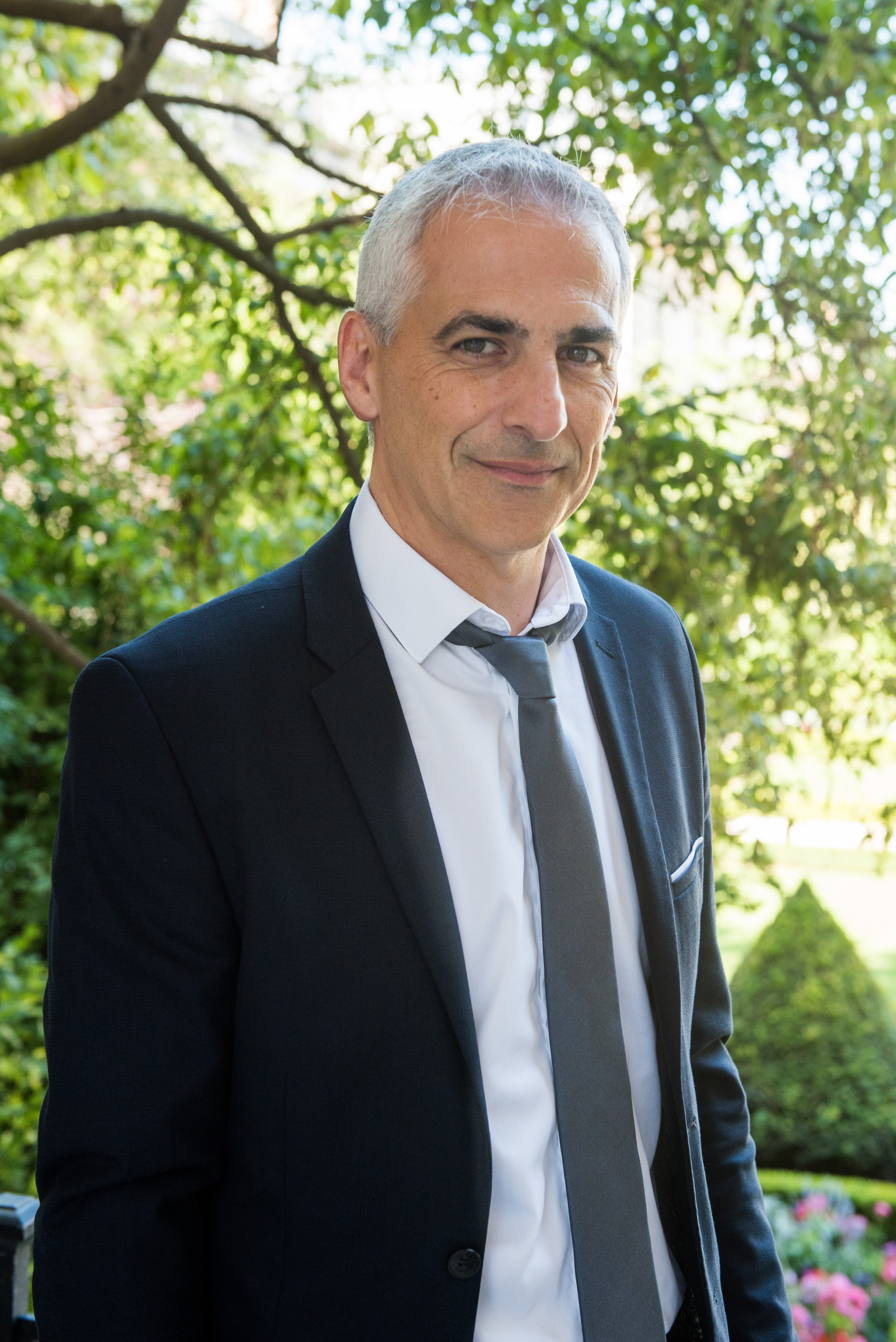
- Fugit in 2017

Member of the National Assembly for Rhône's 11th constituency
- Incumbent
- Assumed office 21 June 2017
- Preceded by: Georges Fenech

Personal details
- Born: 27 November 1969 (age 56) Rodez, France
- Party: Socialist Party (2008–2017); Renaissance (2017–present)
- Education: École Nationale Supérieure des Ingénieurs en Arts Chimiques et Technologiques; National Polytechnic Institute of Toulouse
- Occupation: Chemist, researcher, academic

Jean-Luc Fugit (French pronunciation: [ʒɑ̃lyk fyʒit]; born 27 November 1969) is a French politician who has represented the 11th constituency of the Rhône department in the National Assembly since 2017. A member of Renaissance (RE, formerly La République En Marche!), he was reelected in 2022 and 2024.

Prior to his election to the National Assembly, Fugit was a vice president at Jean Monnet University in Saint-Étienne from 2011 to 2017, which he joined as a chemistry research fellow in 1996. He was also a municipal councillor of La Grand-Croix, Loire from 2008 to 2013, where he was active for the Socialist Party (PS). He has characterised himself as a social democrat.

== See also ==
- Results of the 2024 French legislative election in Rhône
