= Sérézin-du-Rhône =

- Commune
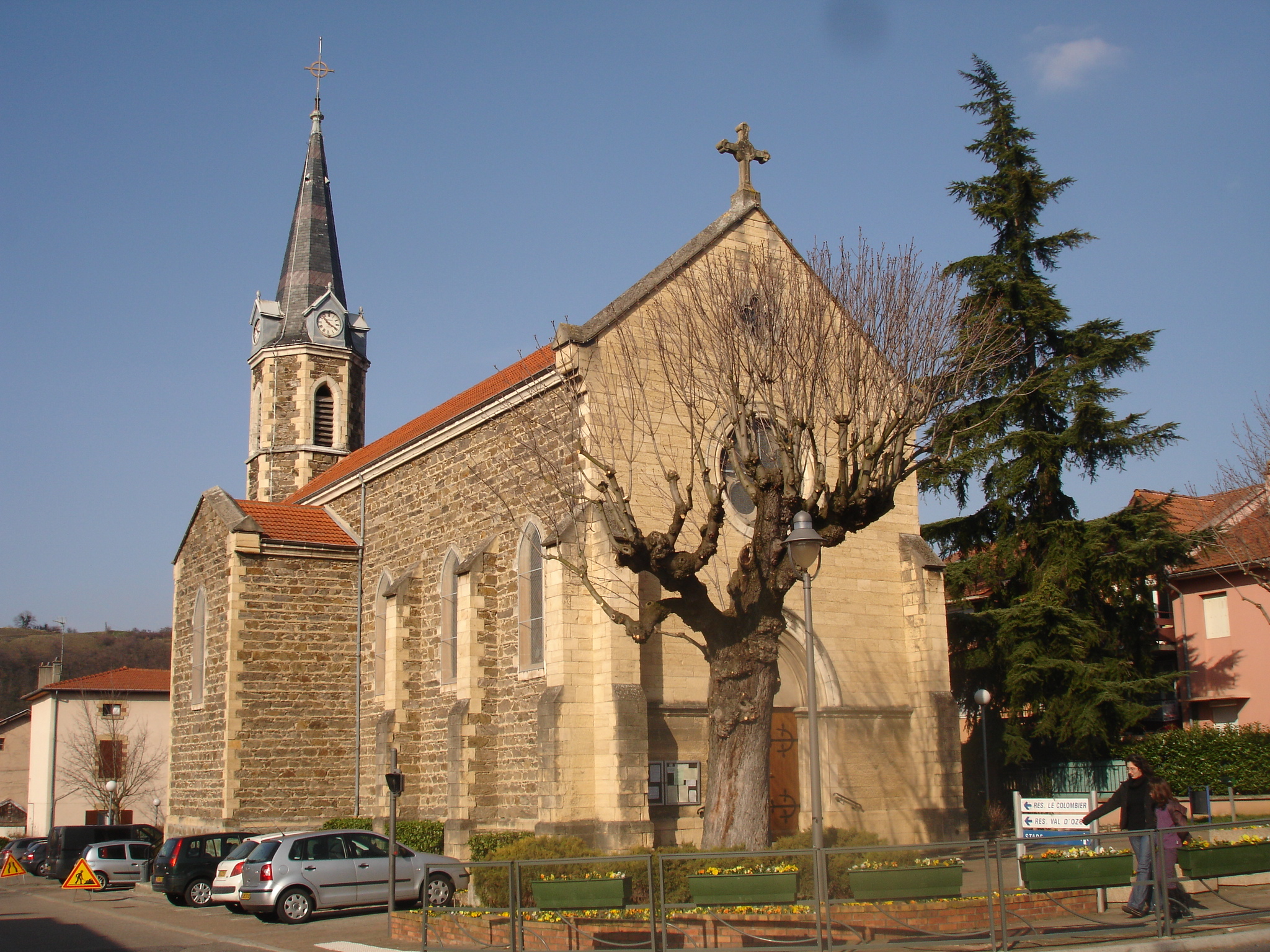
- The church in Sérézin-du-Rhône
- Location of Sérézin-du-Rhône
- Location within France Location within Auvergne-Rhône-Alpes
- Coordinates: 45°37′46″N 4°49′29″E
- Country: France
- Region: Auvergne-Rhône-Alpes
- Department: Rhône
- Arrondissement: Lyon
- Canton: Saint-Symphorien-d'Ozon

Government
  - Mayor (2020–2026): Mireille Bonnefoy
- Area^{1}: 3.97 km^{2} (1.53 sq mi)
- Elevation: 163 m (535 ft)
- Highest elevation: 284 m (932 ft)
- Lowest elevation: 155 m (509 ft)
- Population (2023): 3,133
  - Density: 789/km^{2} (2,040/sq mi)
- Time zone: UTC+01:00 (CET)
  - Summer (DST): UTC+02:00 (CEST)
- INSEE/Postal code: 69294 /69360
- ^{1} French Land Register data, which excludes lakes, ponds, glaciers > 1 km^{2} (0.386 sq mi or 247 acres) and river estuaries.

Sérézin-du-Rhône (French pronunciation: [seʁezɛ̃ dy ʁon]) is a commune in the Rhône department in eastern France.

== Population ==
Historical population
Year	Pop.	±% p.a.
1968	1,088	—
1975	1,727	+6.82%
1982	1,834	+0.86%
1990	2,257	+2.63%
1999	2,388	+0.63%
2007	2,461	+0.38%
2012	2,584	+0.98%
2017	2,664	+0.61%
2023	3,133	+2.74%
Source: INSEE

== See also ==
- Communes of the Rhône department
