= André Gerin =

French politician

Member of the National Assembly for Rhône's 2nd constituency
- In office 2 April 1993 – 19 June 2012
- Preceded by: Marie-Josèphe Sublet
- Succeeded by: Yves Blein

Mayor of Vénissieux
- In office 18 October 1985 – 27 June 2009
- Preceded by: Marcel Houël
- Succeeded by: Michèle Picard

Personal details
- Born: 19 January 1946 (age 80) Vienne, France
- Party: French Communist Party

André Gerin (born 19 January 1946 in Vienne, Isère) is a French politician who was a Deputy in the National Assembly of France between 1993 and 2012. He has been elected in the Rhône department, and is a member of the French Communist Party.
