= Marcel Barbeault =

French serial killer

- Born: Marcel Henri Barbeault; 10 August 1941 (age 85); Liancourt, France
- Other name: "The Shadow Killer"
- Conviction: Murder
- Penalty: Life imprisonment

Details
- Victims: 8
- Span of crimes: 1969–1976
- Country: France
- State: Nogent-sur-Oise
- Date apprehended: 14 December 1976

Marcel Henri Barbeault (born 10 August 1941) is a French serial killer who murdered eight people in Nogent-sur-Oise in the 1970s. He is responsible for the murder of seven women and one man. Because his crimes were always in the evening or early in the morning, he was given the nickname The Shadow Killer (French: tueur de l'ombre).

== Youth ==
The eldest son of a father working as a steam locomotive conductor and a mother working in the textile industry, Barbeault quit school at a very young age after missing his certificat d'études primaries. At the age of 14, he began working in a workshop called "Établissements Rivière" in Creil as a riveter. He then joined the YCW. On 13 December 1960, he joined the army and was mobilized during the Algerian war, where he was a stretcher bearer. Upon his return, he returned to the factory and worked in Saint-Gobain. He soon began to practice boxing and judo and said that he'd like to become a paratrooper or a gendarme; however, he was subject to vertigo and failed the tests eight times. In 1964, he married a woman named Josiane and fathered two boys: Patrice in 1966, and Laurent in 1972. His mother, Micheline, died of cancer in 1968, followed by his two brothers. At this time, he began to burgle homes, and when driving his moped on his way back from work, he would steal weapons. The deaths in Barbeault's family seemed to be the key events for his dive into crime and violence. It's been claimed that the trauma of his mother's double mastectomy before her death could have led to a desire for revenge and similar sexual rites.

== Murders and the investigation ==
On 10 January 1969, Barbeault started his crimes by attempting to kill Françoise Lecron, wife of a Saint-Gobain engineer. He would conclude seven years later on January 6, 1976, with the killing of 20-year-old Françoise Jakubowska, his final victim.

Barbeault attacked his victims along the railway line between 9 and 11 pm, either striking them with a shovel then stabbing them in the heart, or shooting them with his .22 Long Rifle. All of his victims were rumoured to be women of colour, whom he killed after watching for a long time on his days off to monitor their actions. He undressed the corpses but did not violate them and stole their handbags, which is rare among serial killers. Despite this, Barbeault was regarded as a wonderful husband and an exemplary father who was self-contained and "banal." It is this schizophrenic-type duality that allowed him to pass through police nets for years.

Finally, after roughly seven years of stalking, Barbeault was arrested due to an anonymous phone call which described him as "aged 35, 1.80 cm tall, married to a blonde, with two children, no driving license. He served in Algeria, has practised boxing and worked at the Rivière." Commissioner Christian Jacob did not identify the killer per se, but he pinned Barbeault as a suspect. Inspector Daniel Neveu, freshly promoted to the judicial Police of Creil, managed to make the connection between Barbeault and the murders through a 22 LR found in a cemetery and a rifle discovered in the basement of the accused. He found that the key to the enigma was the cemetery of Nogent-sur-Oise, which was in the centre of the triangle area where all the murders took place. In addition, the double homicide of a couple occurred on the parking lot of the Laigneville cemetery. This murder, although different from the others, was also attributed to the "Shadow killer." Inspector Neveu concluded that, unlike the others, it was not premeditated, but was more of an "opportunistic" murder - the killer was on the scene before the couple's arrival and perhaps frequented the cemetery regularly.

The officer's reasoning was corroborated by the discovery of a .22LR bullet near a water tap in the cemetery. The tap was located behind the church, making it hard to find for anyone who didn't visit regularly. Neveu decided to cross out the names of the letters of denunciation and the surnames engraved on the cemetery's graves. The list of 30 names was eventually traced back to Barbeault. His beloved mother had died of breast cancer in her son's arms after much agony, and she had been buried in the Nogent cemetery since 1968.

Neveu interviewed the suspects one by one. While searching Barbeault's home in Montataire on 14 December 1976 he found in his cellar a sawed rifle with a silencer, a raincoat and various caps. Ballistic analysis revealed that the weapon was used in one of the two murders. The weapons used in the other homicides could not be found, but the similar modus operandi left little doubt about a single killer. Due to Barbeault having already been sentenced for burglary in the past, the police reviewed all his crimes in the region and discovered that he had also stolen a rifle. The owner had practised shooting with the weapon in his garden, and the investigators found sockets in it, showing that they had been used for some of the murders. Authorities then pointed out that the days of the murders corresponded to Barbeault's days off.

== Trial and sentencing ==
His trial began at the Beauvais Courthouse on 25 May 1981 in the cour d'assises of Oise. Barbeault was charged with the five murders, but the three other crimes charges attributed to him were dropped due to lack of evidence. He denied being "The Shadow Killer" despite the evidence and acted coldly during the trial.

The general advocate wanted to pursue the death penalty, but fell through as François Mitterrand had just been elected President of the Republic. Mitterrand, the first Socialist president of the Fifth Republic, had announced during the electoral campaign his opposition to the guillotine, and even pending the legislative election in June, the commutation of a sentence of death seemed a virtual certainty. Although Jean-Paul DeClerck and Patrick François had been sentenced to death on May 22, the election ended all plausibility of such a sentence. Despite the five-hour speech of his lawyer Jean-Louis Pelletir, Barbeault was found guilty, and sentenced to life imprisonment on 10 June 1981. (The last sentence of death, for attempted murder, was actually passed on 28 September against Jean-Michel Marx, two days before the law of abolition was passed by the Senate.) He tried to appeal his sentence at the Court of Cassation and the sentence was quashed on 17 March 1982, but was reimposed in November 1983 by the cour d'assises, and Barbeault was resentenced to life imprisonment.

Barbeault remains incarcerated in the central prison of Saint-Maur in Indre, and is employed as the prison librarian.

== See also ==
- List of serial killers by country

=== Bibliography ===
- Daniel Neveu, Le mort n'a pas le profil d'un assassin, Anabet Publisher, 2010, 462 pages, ISBN 2352660661
- François Lapraz, Alain Morel, Terreur en banlieue, l'affaire du tueur de l'Oise, Guy Authier Éditeur, 1977.
- Georges Moréas and Bill Waddell, Murder Case, Investigation of the great crimes of our time, vol. 28: The Shadow Killer. Marcel Barbeault: for seven years, this good father sowed terror in Nogent-sur-Oise, Paris, ALP, 1991, 30 p.
- Alain Hamon, Un tueur dans l'ombre. L'Affaire Marcel Barbeault, I read, 1994 (out of print), 4 January 1999, 186 pages, ISBN 227707067X
- Pascal Michel, 40 ans d'affaires criminelles 1969-2009 (chapitre : L'affaire Marcel Barbeault, le tueur de l'ombre) pages 7 and 13, April 17, 2009, 208 pages, ISBN 978-1-4092-7263-2
- Pascal Dague, Tueurs en série, éd. Publibook, pages 407 and 425, May 11, 2012, 430 pages, ISBN 2748383923

=== TV documentary ===
- Get the Accused, presented by Christophe Hondelatte in February 2005, October 2007 and July 2010 in "Marcel Barbeault: The Shadow Killer" on France 2.

=== Radio shows ===
- "Marcel Barbeault, the killer of the Oise" March 18, 2014 and "Marcel Barbeault case" March 24, 2016 in The Double Hour of Jacques Pradel on RTL.
- "The Marcel Barbeault Affair" August 22, 2016 in Hondelatte tells on Europe 1.

=== External links ===
- Biography of Marcel Barbeault on tueursenserie.org.
- Biography of Marcel Barbeault on 13emerue.fr.
