= Canton of Saint-Symphorien-d'Ozon =

Coordinates: 45.6305°N 4.9003°E

Saint-Symphorien-d'Ozon
- Canton
- Country: France
- Region: Auvergne-Rhône-Alpes
- Department: Rhône
- No. of communes: {{{nbcomm}}}
- Area: 123.08 km^{2} (47.52 sq mi)
- Population (2023): 40,791
  - Density: 331.42/km^{2} (858.37/sq mi)
- INSEE code: 6909

The Canton of Saint-Symphorien-d'Ozon is a French administrative division, located in the Rhône department.

The canton was established in 1790. Its boundaries are modified by decree of 27 February 2014 which came into force in March 2015.

== Composition ==
The canton of Saint-Symphorien-d'Ozon is composed of 11 communes:

Communes	Population (2012)
Chaponnay	3,805
Communay	4,080
Marennes	1,571
Millery	3,686
Montagny	2,604
Orliénas	2,310
Saint-Symphorien-d'Ozon	5,443
Sérézin-du-Rhône	2,584
Simandres	1,692
Taluyers	2,294
Ternay	5,365

== See also ==
- Cantons of the Rhône department
- Communes of the Rhône department
