= François Renaud =

French judge who was murdered in 1975

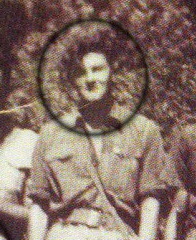
François Renaud

François Renaud (5 March 1923, – 3 July 1975) was a French judge whose murder in 1975 led to much speculation, but was never solved. He was the first judge in France to have been assassinated since World War II. His death inspired the French film Le Juge Fayard dit Le Shériff (1977), directed by Yves Boisset.

== Life ==
Renaud was born in Hao Giang, Tonkin, Vietnam. The son of a doctor, and descendant of an aristocratic lineage one of whom was physician to King Louis XV, he studied first in Toulouse and then in Lyon, before joining the French Resistance in Laives in 1943. After the war, he served in the colonies before returning to Lyon in 1966, where he was appointed principal judge of the palais de justice in 1972. He was married with two sons.

== Death ==
He was shot with three bullets from a Geco.38 special (two into the neck at close range) by three killers in a car on 3 July 1975 at 2:42 in the morning, before his house, la Vigie, located at 89 montée de l'Observance, in 9th arrondissement of Lyon. The crime was investigated by Georges Fenech. The killers have never been formally identified though strong suspicions exist.

His tomb, located in the cemetery of Père-Lachaise, was desecrated in April 2007.
