= Marennes, Rhône =

Marennes
- Commune
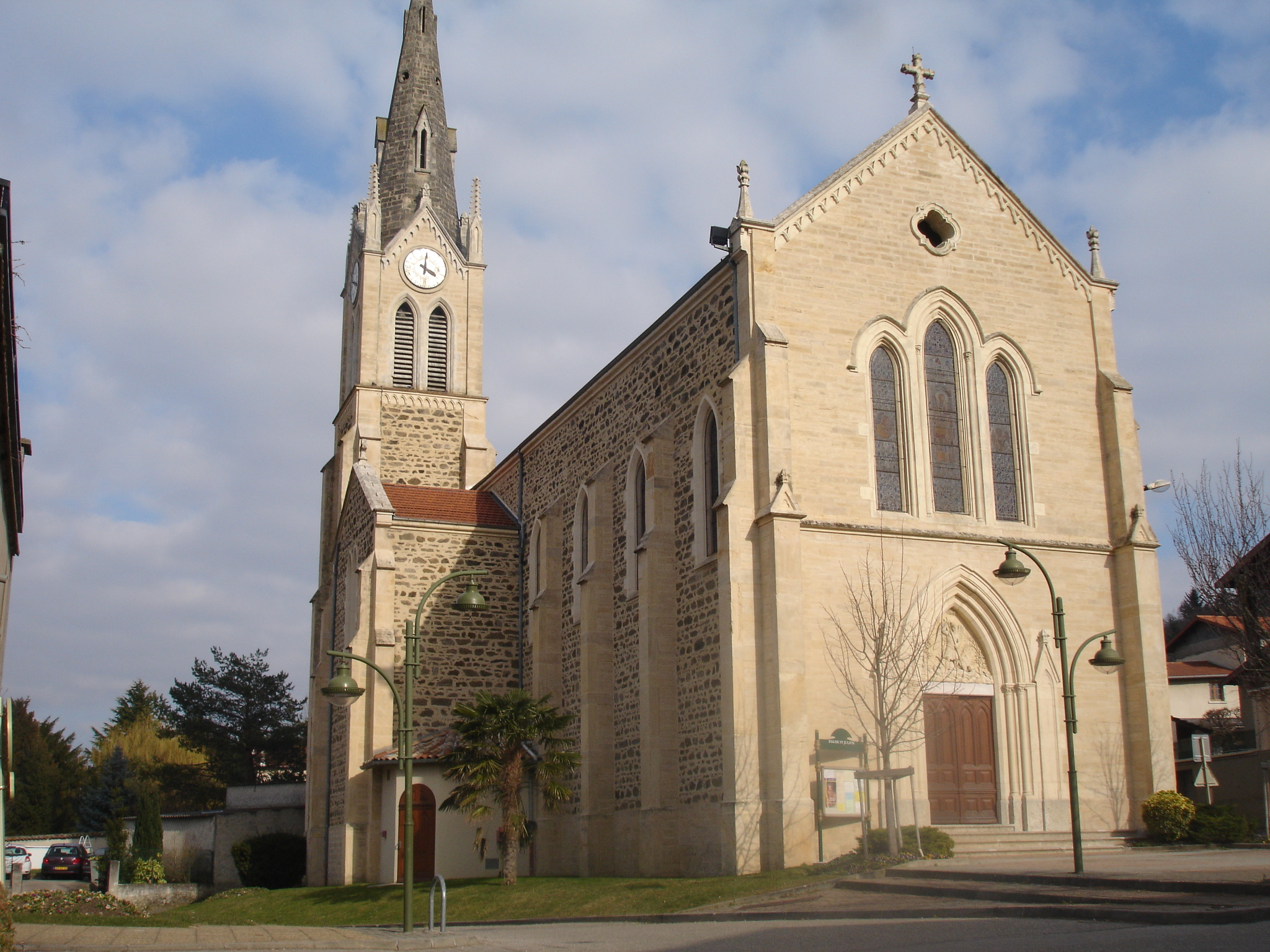
- The church in Marennes
- Location of Marennes
- Location within France Location within Auvergne-Rhône-Alpes
- Coordinates: 45°37′08″N 4°54′40″E
- Country: France
- Region: Auvergne-Rhône-Alpes
- Department: Rhône
- Arrondissement: Lyon
- Canton: Saint-Symphorien-d'Ozon

Government
  - Mayor (2020–2026): Timotéo Abellan
- Area^{1}: 12.44 km^{2} (4.80 sq mi)
- Elevation: 180 m (590 ft)
- Highest elevation: 366 m (1,201 ft)
- Lowest elevation: 183 m (600 ft)
- Population (2023): 1,992
  - Density: 160.1/km^{2} (414.7/sq mi)
- Time zone: UTC+01:00 (CET)
  - Summer (DST): UTC+02:00 (CEST)
- INSEE/Postal code: 69281 /69970
- ^{1} French Land Register data, which excludes lakes, ponds, glaciers > 1 km^{2} (0.386 sq mi or 247 acres) and river estuaries.

Marennes (French pronunciation: [maʁɛn]) is a commune in the Rhône department in eastern France.

== See also ==
- Communes of the Rhône department
