= Saint-Symphorien-d'Ozon =

- Commune
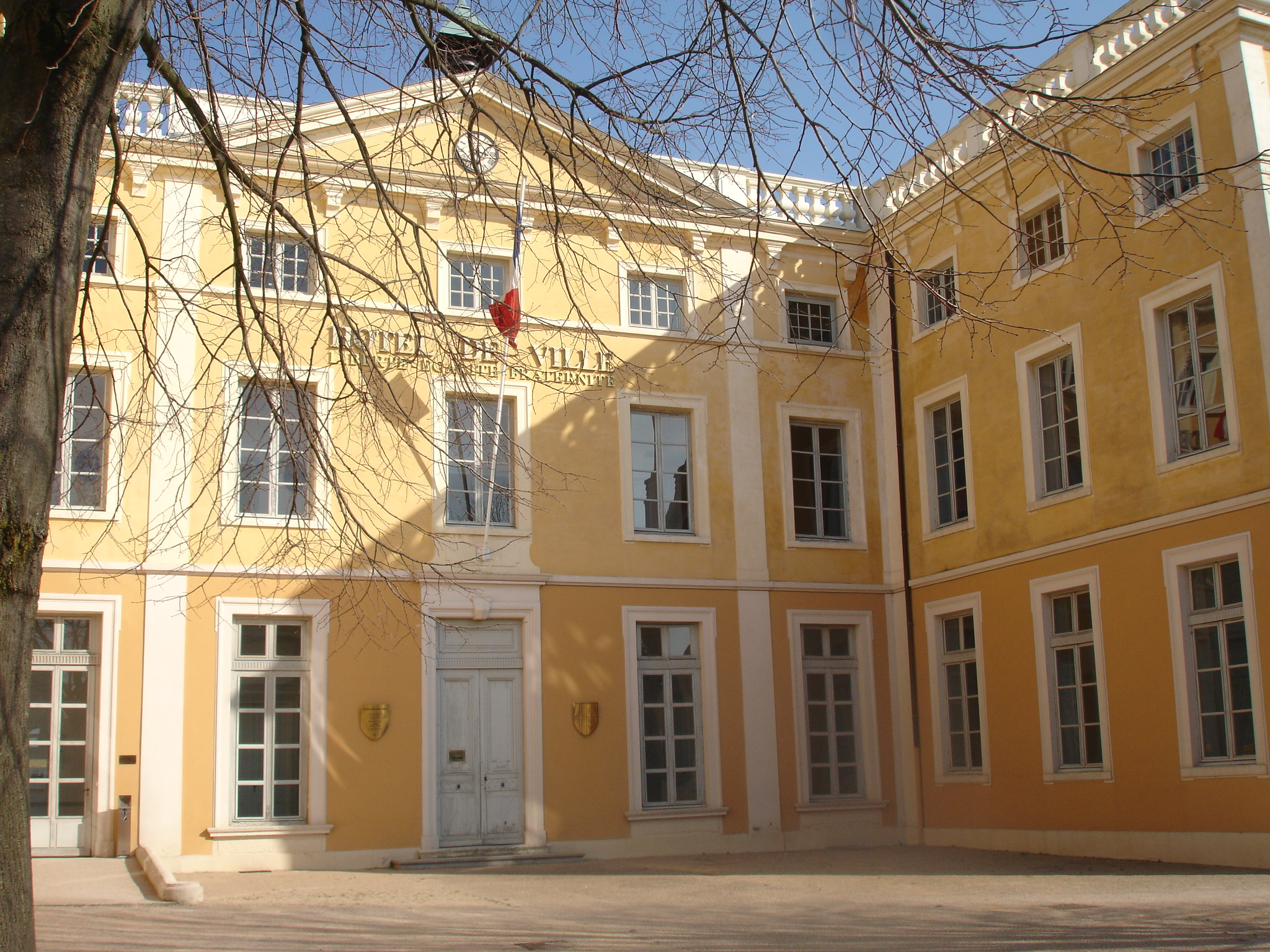
- The town hall in Saint-Symphorien-d'Ozon

- Coat of arms
- Location of Saint-Symphorien-d'Ozon
- Location within France Location within Auvergne-Rhône-Alpes
- Coordinates: 45°38′01″N 4°51′25″E
- Country: France
- Region: Auvergne-Rhône-Alpes
- Department: Rhône
- Arrondissement: Lyon
- Canton: Saint-Symphorien-d'Ozon
- Intercommunality: Pays de l'Ozon

Government
  - Mayor (2020–2026): Pierre Ballesio
- Area^{1}: 13.37 km^{2} (5.16 sq mi)
- Elevation: 146 m (479 ft)
- Highest elevation: 308 m (1,010 ft)
- Lowest elevation: 168 m (551 ft)
- Population (2023): 6,186
  - Density: 462.7/km^{2} (1,198/sq mi)
- Time zone: UTC+01:00 (CET)
  - Summer (DST): UTC+02:00 (CEST)
- INSEE/Postal code: 69291 /69360
- ^{1} French Land Register data, which excludes lakes, ponds, glaciers > 1 km^{2} (0.386 sq mi or 247 acres) and river estuaries.

Saint-Symphorien-d'Ozon (French pronunciation: [sɛ̃ sɛ̃fɔʁjɛ̃ dozɔ̃]) is a commune in the Rhône department, within the urban area of Lyon, in eastern France.

== Population ==
Historical population
Year	Pop.	±% p.a.
1968	3,028	—
1975	3,537	+2.24%
1982	4,850	+4.61%
1990	5,167	+0.79%
1999	5,063	−0.23%
2007	5,217	+0.38%
2012	5,443	+0.85%
2017	5,735	+1.05%
2023	6,186	+1.27%
Source: INSEE

== See also ==
- Communes of the Rhône department
