= Rhône's 11th constituency =

Constituency of the National Assembly of France

11th constituency of the Rhône
- inline Constituency of the National Assembly of France

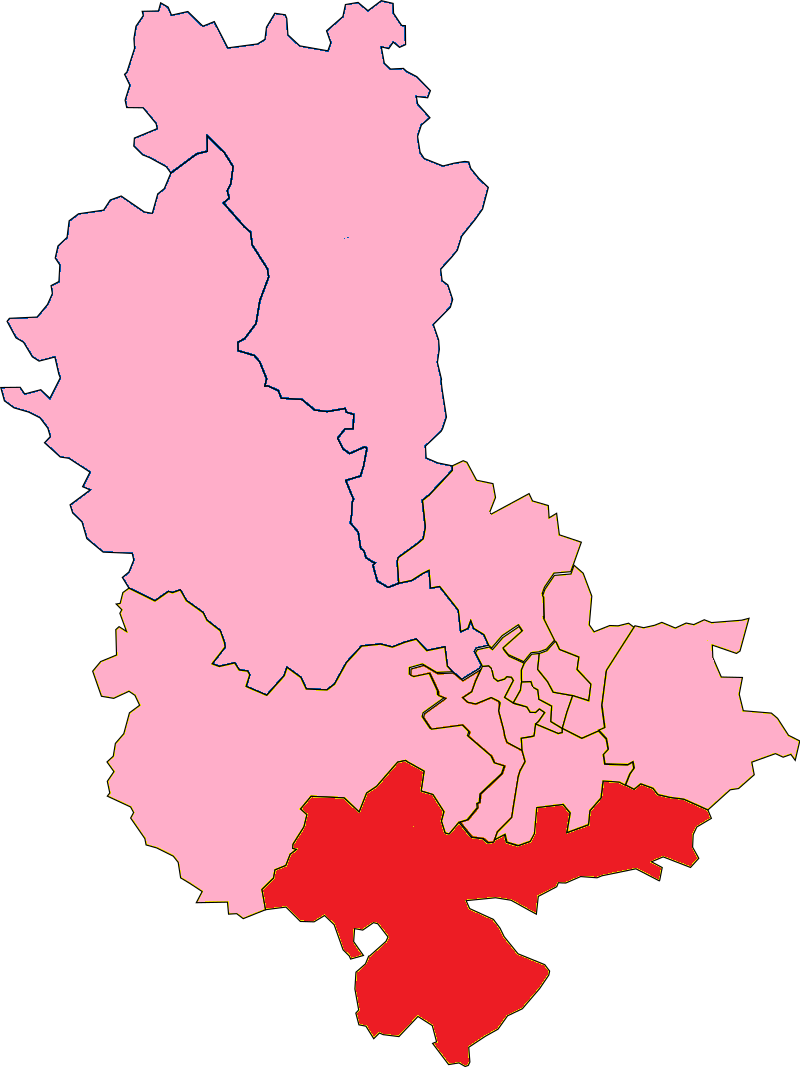
- Rhône's's 11th Constituency shown within the Rhône
- Deputy: Jean-Luc Fugit; RE
- Department: Rhône
- Cantons: Condrieu, Givors, Mornant, Saint-Symphorien-d'Ozon
- Registered voters: 92513

The 11th constituency of the Rhône (French: Onzième circonscription du Rhône) is a French legislative constituency in the Rhône département. Like the other 576 French constituencies, it elects one MP using a two round electoral system.

== Description ==
The 11th constituency of the Rhône lies to the south of Lyon along the southern border of the department.

== Assembly Members ==
Election	Member	Party
1988	Gabriel Montcharmont	PS
1993	Jean-Claude Bahu	RPR
1997	Gabriel Montcharmont	PS
2002	Georges Fenech	UMP
2007	Georges Fenech	UMP
2008	Raymond Durand	NC
2012	Georges Fenech	UMP
2017	Jean-Luc Fugit	LREM
2022	Jean-Luc Fugit	LREM
2024	Jean-Luc Fugit	RE

== Election results ==
=== 2024 ===
Legislative Election 2024: Rhône's 11th constituency
Party	Candidate	Votes	%	±%
LR (UXD)	Alexandre Humbert Dupalais	25,371	36.81	+16.74
RE (Ensemble)	Jean-Luc Fugit	18,564	26.93	-3.62
PCF (NFP)	Abdel Yousfi	15,765	22.87	+1.27
LR	Cindy Ferro	6,707	9.73	+5.41
ÉAC	Sophie Spennato	1,974	2.86	−0.50
LO	Isabelle Browning	550	0.80	N/A
Turnout		68,932	97.86	+49.22
Registered electors		98,020		
2nd round result
LR	Alexandre Humbert Dupalais	29,069	43.20	N/A
RE	Jean-Luc Fugit	38,214	56.80	−7.29
Turnout		67,283	95.73	+50.22
Registered electors		98,040		
RE hold		Swing		

=== 2022 ===
Legislative Election 2022: Rhone's 11th constituency
Party	Candidate	Votes	%	±%
LREM (Ensemble)	Jean-Luc Fugit	14,112	30.55	-8.65
PCF (NUPÉS)	Abdel Yousfi	9,979	21.60	+0.93
RN	Michel Dulac	9,271	20.07	+5.42
LR (UDC)	Paul Vidal	6,993	15.14	−5.52
REC	Charles Ascarino	2,148	4.65	N/A
DVE	Sophie Spennato	1,552	3.36	N/A
Others	N/A	2,137	-	−
Turnout		46,192	48.64	+0.60
2nd round result
LREM (Ensemble)	Jean-Luc Fugit	25,864	64.09	-9.38
PCF (NUPÉS)	Abdel Yousfi	14,489	35.91	N/A
Turnout		40,353	45.51	+7.59
LREM hold				

=== 2017 ===
Legislative Election 2017: Rhône's 11th constituency
Party	Candidate	Votes	%	±%
LREM	Jean-Luc Fugit	17,422	39.20	
LR	Georges Fenech	9,182	20.66	
FN	Antoine Mellies	6,511	14.65	
LFI	Christine Valentin	4,771	10.73	
EELV	Jérôme Bub	1,707	3.84	
PS	Jules Jossard	1,470	3.31	
PCF	Raymond Combaz	1,240	2.79	
Others	N/A	2,144		
Turnout		44,447	48.04	
2nd round result
LREM	Jean-Luc Fugit	19,192	54.71	
LR	Georges Fenech	15,886	45.29	
Turnout		35,078	37.92	
LREM gain from LR				

=== 2012 ===
Legislative Election 2012: Rhône's 11th constituency
Party	Candidate	Votes	%	±%
UMP	Georges Fenech	14,726	29.28	
FN	Agnès Henry	9,475	18.84	
PRG	France Gamerre	9,031	17.96	
DVG	Guy Palluy	6,080	12.09	
FG	René Balme	4,151	8.25	
NM	Raymond Durand	3,964	7.88	
EELV	Jean-Charles Kohlhaas	1,923	3.82	
Others	N/A	939		
Turnout		50,289	58.80	
2nd round result
UMP	Georges Fenech	22,494	65.02	
FN	Agnès Henry	12,104	34.98	
Turnout		34,598	40.46	
UMP hold				

=== 2007 ===
Legislative Election 2007: Rhône's 11th constituency
Party	Candidate	Votes	%	±%
UMP	Georges Fenech	23,056	48.09	
PS	Jean-François Gagneur	11,334	23.64	
MoDem	Blandine Martin	4,622	9.64	
FN	Anne-Marie Perret	2,465	5.14	
LV	Roger Frety	2,107	4.39	
Far left	Christian Castro	1,690	3.52	
Others	N/A	2,671		
Turnout		48,678	60.74	
2nd round result
UMP	Georges Fenech	25,843	56.54	
PS	Jean-François Gagneur	19,865	43.46	
Turnout		46,928	58.56	
UMP hold				

=== 2002 ===
Legislative Election 2002: Rhône's 11th constituency
Party	Candidate	Votes	%	±%
PS	Gabriel Montcharmont	15,009	31.83	
UMP	Georges Fenech	9,870	20.93	
FN	Y.Yves Lussiaud	7,198	15.26	
UDF	Raymond Durand	7,108	15.07	
DL	Paul Vidal	3,499	7.42	
Others	N/A	5,491		
Turnout		47,940	65.49	
2nd round result
UMP	Georges Fenech	21,518	51.98	
PS	Gabriel Montcharmont	19,878	48.02	
Turnout		43,263	59.10	
UMP gain from PS				

=== 1997 ===
Legislative Election 1997: Rhône's 11th constituency
Party	Candidate	Votes	%	±%
RPR	Jean-Claude Bahu	12,214	27.34	
PS	Gabriel Montcharmont	10,645	23.83	
FN	Patrick Deveyle	9,971	22.32	
PCF	Martial Passi	4,532	10.14	
LV	Thierry Girardot	1,787	4.00	
GE	Jean-Claude Caira	1,695	3.79	
LO	Jean-Marc Barreau	1,531	3.43	
DVD	Denis Ribeyre	1,246	2.79	
Others	N/A	1,054		
Turnout		46,831	69.21	
2nd round result
PS	Gabriel Montcharmont	20,869	43.13	
RPR	Jean-Claude Bahu	19,887	41.10	
FN	Patrick Deveyle	7,628	15.77	
Turnout		49,981	73.87	
PS gain from RPR				
