= Société du pipeline sud-européen =

- Industry: Oil and gas industry
- Founded: 1958
- Headquarters: Neuilly sur Seine, France
- Services: Crude oil transportation
- Website: www.spse.fr

Société du pipeline sud-européen (SPSE) is an oil pipeline company established in France. It is an owner and operator of the South European Pipeline, a crude oil pipeline system which runs from Fos-sur-Mer in France to Karlsruhe in Germany. The company also runs a maritime terminal in Fos-sur-mer which is made up of 40 tanks having a total capacity of 2.26 million cubic metres (80×10^{6} cu ft).

The company was founded in 1958 by sixteen oil companies to build and operate the South European Pipeline. As of 2011, the shareholders are:

- Total S.A. (27.84%)
- ExxonMobil (22%)
- Société de Participations dans l'Industrie et le Transport du Pétrole (15.4%)
- BP (12.1%)
- Royal Dutch Shell (10.32%)
- BASF (10%)
- Phillips 66 (2%)
