= Feyzin =

- Commune
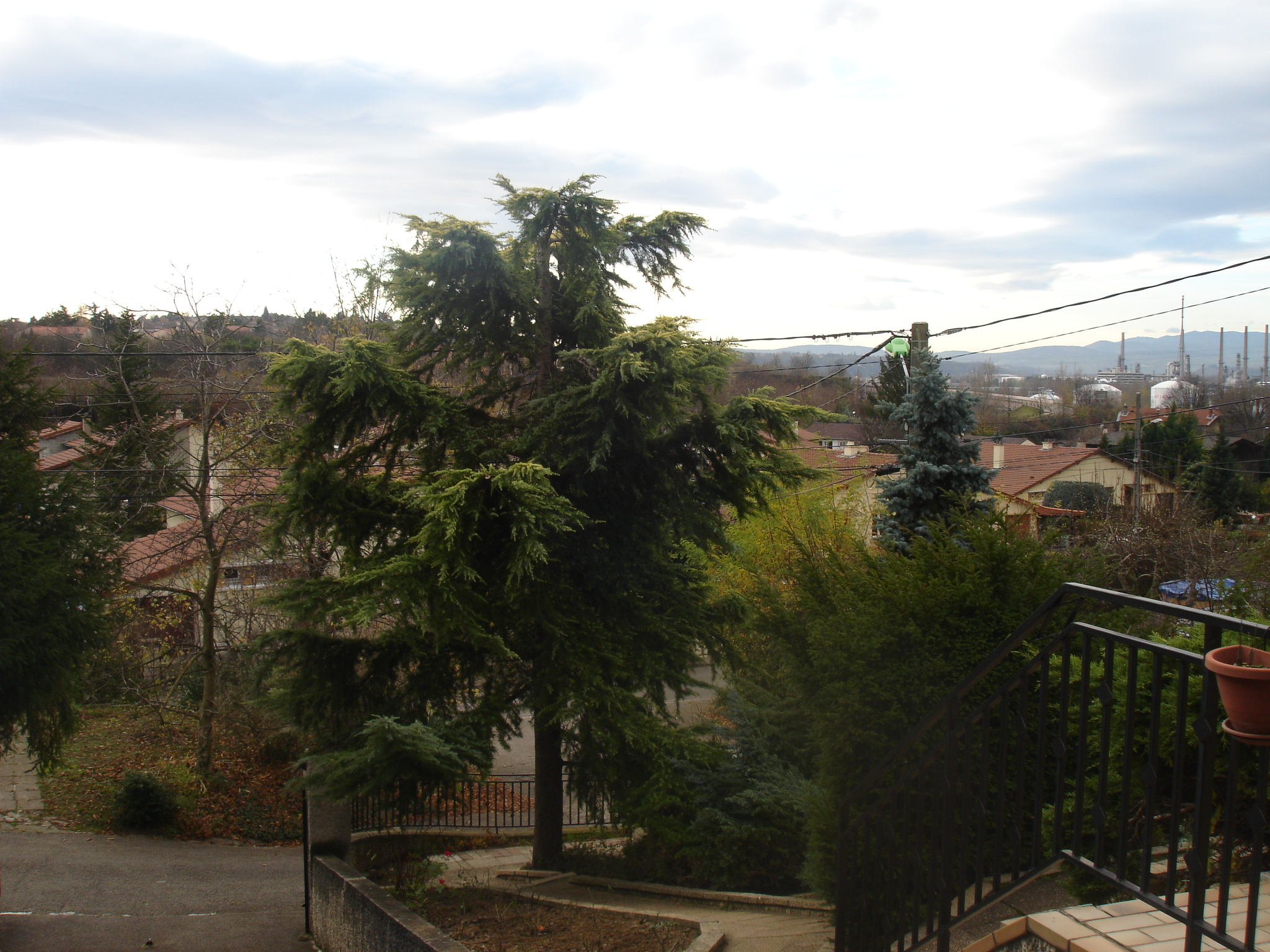
- A general view of Feyzin

- Coat of arms
- Location of Feyzin
- Location within France Location within Auvergne-Rhône-Alpes
- Coordinates: 45°40′23″N 4°51′32″E
- Country: France
- Region: Auvergne-Rhône-Alpes
- Metropolis: Lyon Metropolis
- Arrondissement: Lyon

Government
  - Mayor (2020–2026): Murielle Laurent
- Area^{1}: 9.64 km^{2} (3.72 sq mi)
- Elevation: 204 m (669 ft)
- Highest elevation: 234 m (768 ft)
- Lowest elevation: 155 m (509 ft)
- Population (2023): 10,304
  - Density: 1,070/km^{2} (2,770/sq mi)
- Time zone: UTC+01:00 (CET)
  - Summer (DST): UTC+02:00 (CEST)
- INSEE/Postal code: 69276 /69320
- ^{1} French Land Register data, which excludes lakes, ponds, glaciers > 1 km^{2} (0.386 sq mi or 247 acres) and river estuaries.

Feyzin (French pronunciation: [fɛzɛ̃]) is a commune in the Metropolis of Lyon in Auvergne-Rhône-Alpes region in eastern France.

== History ==
The refinery near Feyzin was the location of an explosion and fire on January 4, 1966 which resulted in the deaths of 18 people and the injury of 81.

== Population ==
Historical population
Year	Pop.	±% p.a.
1968	5,604	—
1975	7,346	+3.94%
1982	7,753	+0.77%
1990	8,520	+1.19%
1999	8,469	−0.07%
2007	9,357	+1.25%
2012	9,370	+0.03%
2017	9,857	+1.02%
2023	10,304	+0.74%
Source: INSEE

== Transports ==
There are many Bus Lines and the tramway line for direction Vénissieux station and 8th arrondissement.
