= Sanctuary of Santa Gemma, Lucca =

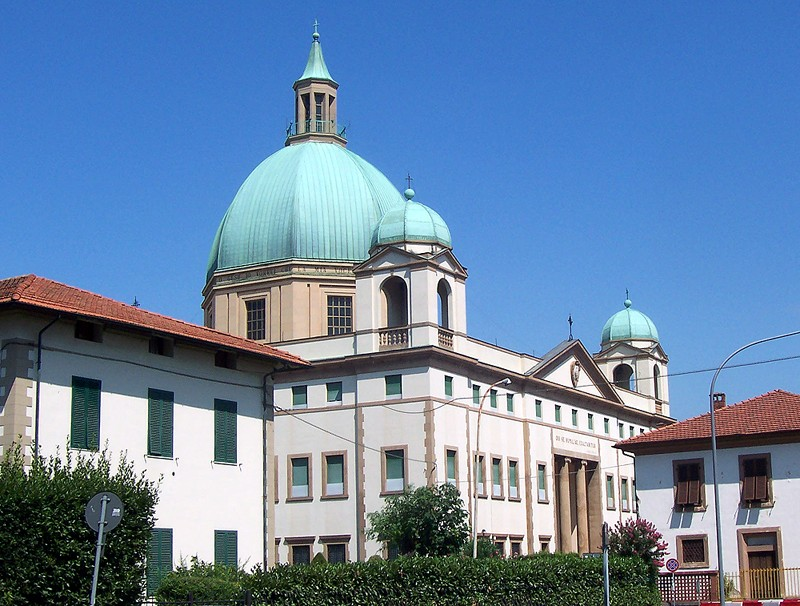
- Facade

- Location within Italy
- Sanctuary of Santa Gemma, Lucca
- 43°50′34″N 10°31′09″E
- Location: Lucca, Tuscany
- Country: Italy
- Denomination: Roman Catholic

The Santuario di Santa Gemma is a Roman Catholic church-sanctuary devoted to the local saint and mystic Gemma Galgani located on Via di Tiglio outside the medieval walls of Lucca, region of Tuscany, Italy.

== History ==
The church and monastery dates from 1935. The convent hosts nuns of the community of Passionist nuns. Gemma Galgani lived at this monastery and is buried here after her death in 1903. Design of the new convent was entrusted to Italo Baccelli. The dome and bell-tower suggest a reduced size version of the Cathedral of Berlin. The work was not completed till 1965 by the architect Adriano Marabini.

The relics of the saint are below the main altar in an urn sculpted by Francesco Nagni. The church's altarpiece depicts Christ creates stigmata on Gemma Galgani while she is held by the Angel of Passion by Primo Conti. To the left of the altar is a marble sculptural group depicting the Passion of Christ by Tommaso Gismondi. The same sculptor completed the bronze reliefs of the Passion of Mary.
