= Gemma Galgani =

Italian Catholic mystic and saint (1878–1903)

Saint Gemma Galgani
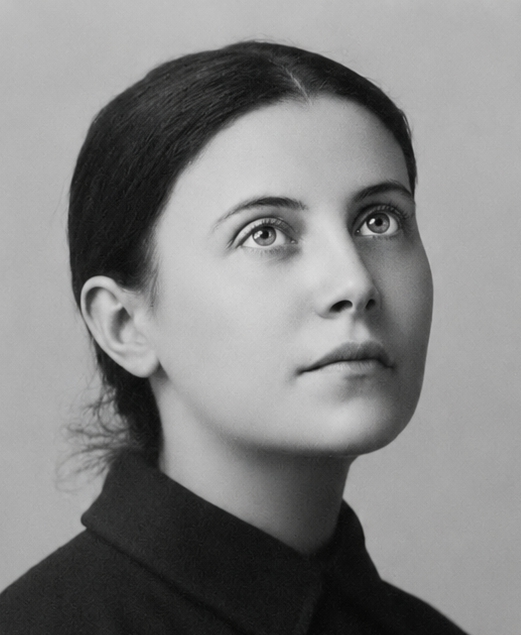
- Galgani in 1900

Virgin
- Born: Gemma Umberta Maria Galgani; 12 March 1878; Camigliano, Capannori, Italy
- Died: 11 April 1903 (aged 25); Lucca, Italy
- Venerated in: Catholic Church
- Beatified: 14 May 1933 by Pope Pius XI
- Canonized: 2 May 1940, Saint Peter's Basilica, Vatican City by Pope Pius XII
- Major shrine: Passionist Monastery in Lucca, Italy
- Feast: 11 April (celebrated by Passionists on 16 May)
- Attributes: Passionist habit, flowers (lilies and roses), crucifix, stigmata
- Patronage: Students, pharmacists, paratroopers, and parachutists, loss of parents, those suffering back injury or back pain, those suffering with headaches/migraines, those struggling with temptations to impurity and those seeking purity of heart

Gemma Umberta Pia Galgani (12 March 1878 – 11 April 1903), also known as Gemma of Lucca, was an Italian mystic, canonized as a saint in the Catholic Church in 1940. She has been called the "daughter of the Passion" because of her profound imitation of the Passion of Christ. She is especially venerated in the Congregation of the Passion of Jesus Christ (Passionists) while during her life, she was rejected by the Passionists.

== Life ==
=== Early life ===
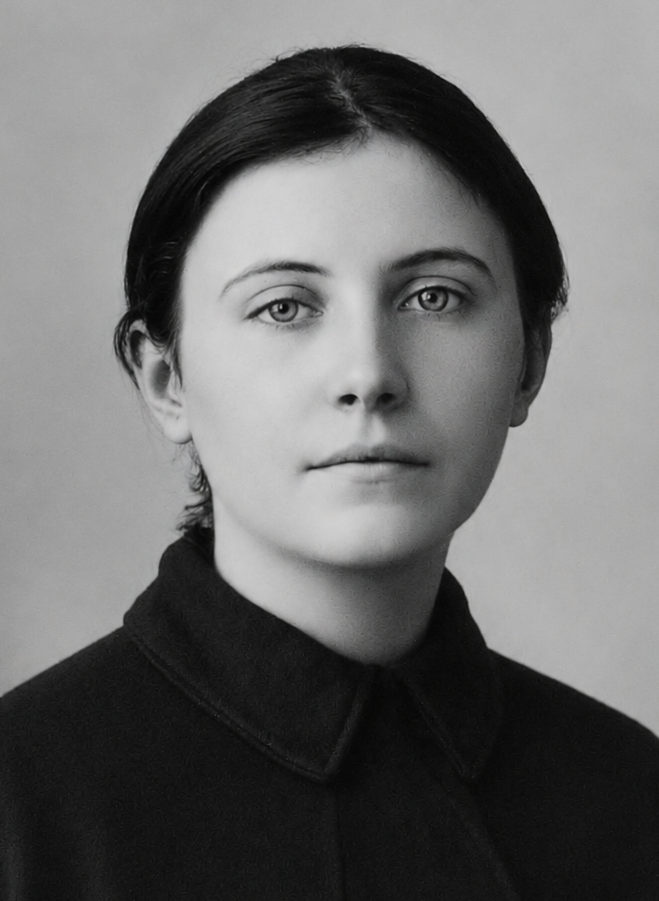
Original photograph of Saint Gemma Galgani 2 (1900)

Gemma Umberta Maria (Pia) Galgani was born on 12 March 1878, in the hamlet of Camigliano in the comune of Capannori, province of Lucca. She was the fifth of eight children and the first daughter; her father, Enrico Galgani, was a prosperous pharmacist.

Soon after Galgani's birth, the family relocated north from Camigliano to a larger new home in the Tuscan city of Lucca. Her parents moved the family to Lucca to increase educational opportunities available to their children. Galgani's mother, Aurelia Landi, contracted tuberculosis when Galgani was two and a half years old. Due to the difficulty of raising a child without her mother, Galgani was placed in a private nursery school run by Elena and Ersilia Vallini.

On 26 May 1885, the archbishop of Lucca, Nicola Ghilardi, administered the sacrament of confirmation to her in the church of San Michele in Foro.

Several members of the Galgani family died during this period. Their firstborn child, Carlo, and Galgani's sister Giulia died at an early age. On 17 September 1886 Aurelia Galgani died from tuberculosis, which she had suffered from for five years, and Galgani's beloved brother Gino died in 1894 at the age of 18 from the same disease while studying for the priesthood. Her ordinary confessor since her childhood was Giovanni Volpi, the later Bishop of Arezzo.

=== Education ===
Galgani was sent to a Catholic half-boarding school in Lucca run by the Oblates of the Holy Spirit, a congregation founded by Saint Elena Guerra. She excelled in French, arithmetic, and music. On 17 June 1887, the feast of the Sacred Heart of Jesus, she received her First Communion.

=== Young adulthood ===
In the years 1898/99 Galgani fell seriously ill (suffering, among other things, from osteitis of the lumbar vertebrae and an ear infection; she also lost the use of her legs), but recovered. She attributed her extraordinary cure to the Sacred Heart of Jesus through the intercession of Saints Gabriel of Our Lady of Sorrows and Marguerite Marie Alacoque. She had a particular devotion to the Sacred Heart.

On 11 November 1897, her father Enrico died of throat cancer, and Galgani was thereafter responsible for raising her younger siblings, which she did with her aunt Carolina. She declined two marriage proposals.

From September 1900 onwards, Gemma Galgani was under the spiritual guidance of Germano Ruoppolo, with whom she maintained an extensive correspondence. Around the same time, she was taken in by the Giannini family in Lucca, in whose house she lived until shortly before her death; a maternal role was assumed by the unmarried Cecilia Giannini.

=== Mystical experiences ===
According to a biography by her spiritual director, Germano Ruoppolo, Galgani began to manifest the stigmata on 8 June 1899, at the age of 21. She stated that she had spoken with her guardian angel, Jesus, the Virgin Mary, and other saints especially Gabriel of Our Lady of Sorrows. According to her testimonies, she sometimes received special messages from them about current or future events. With her health in decline, Ruoppolo directed her to pray for the disappearance of her stigmata; she did so and the marks left. She said that she resisted the devil's attacks often.

Galgani was frequently found in a state of ecstasy. She has also been reputed to levitate: she claimed that on one occasion, when her arms were around the crucifix in her dining room and was kissing the side wound of Jesus, she found herself raised from the floor.

=== Stigmata and medical examinations ===
Gemma Galgani is said to have experienced stigmata on 8 June 1899, the eve of the feast of the Sacred Heart. She wrote:

I felt an inward sorrow for my sins, but so intense that I have never felt the like again ... My will made me detest them all, and promise willingly to suffer everything as expiation for them. Then the thoughts crowded thickly within me, and they were thoughts of sorrow, love, fear, hope and comfort.

In her subsequent rapture, she saw her guardian angel in the company of the Virgin Mary:

The Blessed Virgin Mary opened her mantle and covered me with it. At that very moment, Jesus appeared with his wounds all open; blood was not flowing from them, but flames of fire which in one moment came and touched my hands, feet and heart. I felt I was dying, and should have fallen down but for my Mother (Blessed Virgin Mary) who supported me and kept me under her mantle. Thus I remained for several hours. Then my Mother kissed my forehead, the vision disappeared and I found myself on my knees; but I still had a keen pain in my hands, feet and heart. I got up to get into bed and saw that blood was coming from the places where I had the pain. I covered them as well as I could and then, helped by my guardian angel, got into bed.

The physician Pietro Pfanner, who had known Galgani since her childhood, examined her stigmata. In his opinion, the marks were signs of hysterical behaviour, and he suspected Galgani may have suffered from a form of neurosis. Pfanner examined Galgani and noted spots of blood on the palms of her hands, but when he ordered the blood be wiped off with a wet towel, there was no wound. He concluded the phenomenon to be self-inflicted. On another occasion, Galgani's foster mother Cecilia Giannini observed a sewing needle on the floor next to her. Psychologist Donovan Rawcliffe argued that Galgani's stigmata were "self-inflicted wounds of a major hysteric".

By contrast, several persons from Galgani's immediate circle attested to the presence of continuous wounds that fully pierced her palms: her spiritual director Germano Ruoppolo, the later Archbishop Pietro Paolo Moreschini, as well as several members of the Giannini family, in whose house Galgani had lived since 1900 - among them Matteo and Giustina Giannini, and in particular the unmarried Cecilia Giannini, who stood by Galgani like a foster mother.

=== Rejection ===
Gemma Galgani was rejected by the Passionists.

"During this time Gemma ardently desired to make a retreat in the Passionist Convent at Corneto in company with Signora Cecilia, and the two eldest Giannini girls. Her confessor, Monsignor Volpi also wished it. Signora Cecilia wrote at once to the Superioress: "Annetta, Euphemia and myself would like to make a retreat, also a young girl, an orphan, who is with us, Gemma Galgani."

"But would you believe it," wrote Signora Cecilia to Father Germano, "the Superior replied that she could not accept her (Gemma) on account of the opposition of the nuns who had heard a great deal of talk about her from different people. Just think of this poor young girl who would have been so happy to go."

The Superior had actually written thus: "We will not have the convent contaminated by her." An expression as harsh as it was also contemptuous. Gemma's humility, charity and abandon under this hard blow was really heroic. She had looked forward so much to making this retreat, and to see herself thus heartlessly rejected was a terrible grief. Poor Gemma, she could not restrain her tears, but there was not a shadow of resentment. "I shall make it all the same," she said, that was all. [She thus planned on making a private retreat by herself]"

=== Contemporary reception ===
Gemma Galgani was well-known in the vicinity of Lucca before her death, especially to those in poverty. Opinions of her were divided: some admired her extraordinary virtues and called her as "the virgin of Lucca" out of pious respect and admiration, while others mocked her. These included her younger sister, Angelina, who would make fun of Galgani during such experiences.

=== Illness and death ===
In early 1903, Gemma Galgani was diagnosed with tuberculosis, and went into a long and often painful decline accompanied by several mystical phenomena. One of the religious nursing sisters who attended to her stated,

We have cared for a good many sick people, but we have never seen anything like this.

At the beginning of Holy Week 1903, her health quickly deteriorated, and by Good Friday she was suffering tremendously, eventually dying in a small room across from the Giannini house on 11 April 1903, Holy Saturday.

=== Veneration ===
After a thorough examination of her life by the Church, Gemma Galgani was beatified on 14 May 1933 and canonized on 2 May 1940. Galgani's relics are housed at the Sanctuary of Santa Gemma associated with the Passionist monastery in Lucca, Italy. Her bronze effigy atop her tomb was crafted by sculptor Francesco Nagni. In 1985, her heart was enshrined in the Santuario de Santa Gema in Madrid, Spain. Gemma Galgani's spiritual director, Germano Ruoppolo, produced her biography.

== Bibliography ==
- Rudoph M. Bell; Cristina Mazzoni (2003). The Voices of Gemma Galgani: The Life and Afterlife of a Modern Saint. Chicago, IL, US: University of Chicago Press. ISBN 978-0-226-04196-4.
- Robert A. Orsi (2005): "Two Aspects of One Life" in Between Heaven and Earth: The Religious Worlds People Make and the Scholars Who Study Them. Princeton University Press, p. 110–145.
- Hervé Roullet (2019). Gemma Galgani. Paris, France: Roullet Hervé. ISBN 978-2956313731.
