= Jean Dubé =

Jean Dubé is the name of:

- Jean-Eudes Dubé (1926–2019), Canadian politician
- Jean F. Dubé (born 1962), Canadian politician and businessman
- Jean Dubé (musician) (born 1981), French pianist
