= Hervé Roullet =

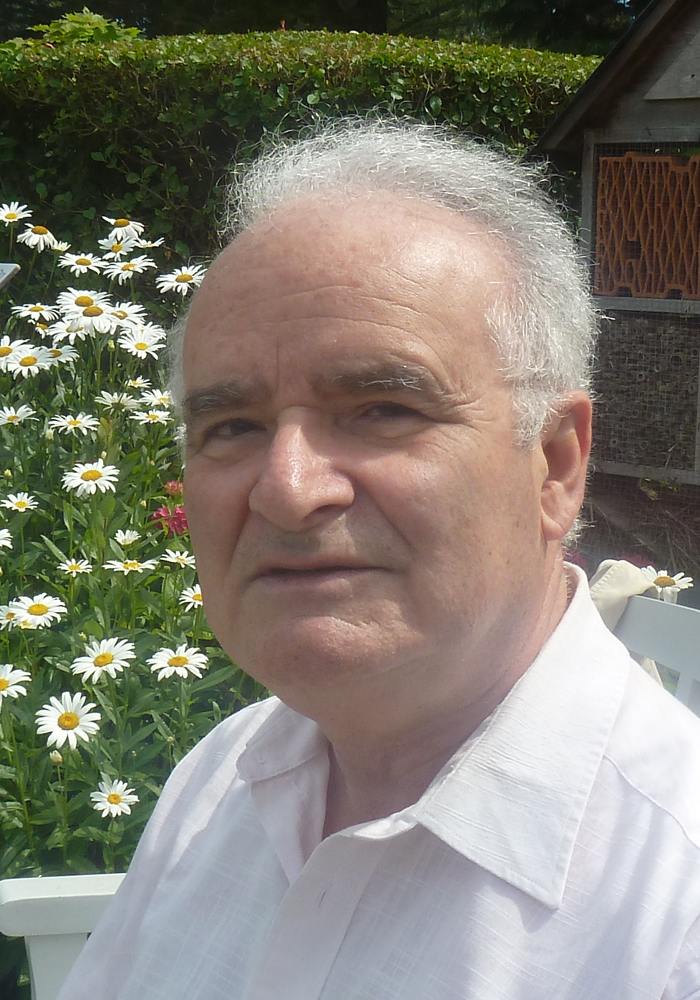
Roullet in December 2016

Hervé Roullet (born 7 September 1947) is a composer and French Catholic writer.

== Biography ==
Roullet was born in Boulogne-Billancourt, near Paris, on 7 September 1947. He is an engineer from the École supérieure d'agriculture d'Angers and he graduated from IAE Paris (also known as Sorbonne Graduate Business School).

He spent his professional career in the Parisian headquarters of various banking groups. He is also a composer of piano music and liturgical chants and Christian writer.

=== Musical works ===
Roullet was taught by Henry Mesmin, a disciple of Vincent d'Indy and Déodat de Séverac. He is of the romantic tradition, with modern characteristics.

The writer and music critic Jean Cabourg defined him as a "musical watercolor artist haunted by grace " and added "a music which smells good, to quote Claude Debussy". His music, which is intimate and melodious, expresses a personal and original language. He pays homage to the beauty of creation, and appears to aim for an ideal which will give peace of mind and change of scenery.

- Piano pieces

The Pieces for piano are in two volumes : the Croquis champêtres et the Voyages oniriques.

Patrick Tudoret, the 2009 Grand prix de la Critique littéraire laureate, establishes a relationship between Jean Cras's works and those of Hervé Roullet: "[…] the complicity of a dreamed time between Jean Cras and the contemporary sensibility of Hervé Roullet impose upon the sober and haughty touch of Jean Dubé (musician). Deux impromptus and Ames d'enfants with Xavier Bouchaud, of the first one, find singular correspondences in the Croquis champêtres and the Voyages oniriques of the second"

- Liturgical pieces

The liturgical works are chants for mixed chorus, a cappella, or with piano or organ accompaniment. All the parts form a triptych: chants for the Mass (liturgy), Marian chants and other liturgical chants. The used texts find their source in the Bible, the Roman Catholic liturgy, the Fathers of the Church or saints.

Among liturgical chants: Ave Verum Corpus, Tantum ergo, Our Father, Anima Christi, Divine Praises, ...

Among chants of Marian devotion: Ave Maria, Ave Maris Stella, Salve Regina, Ave Regina caelorum, Regina caeli,...

=== Literary works ===
Roullet followed theological studies during 1995–2003, in Paris. He received a Master of Theology from the Institut Catholique de Paris, specialization in ecumenism, on October 17, 2003.

He is the author of twenty-six books in French related to Christianity. Twenty-one have received the Imprimatur of the Archbishop of Paris:

- Pellevoisin. Marie visite Estelle, Paris, Hervé Roullet, AVM Diffusion, 2026.
- Genevieve. Sainte Geneviève, patronne de Paris. La vierge gestionnaire, Paris, Hervé Roullet, AVM Diffusion, 2025.
- Le Laus (Our Lady of Laus). 54 years of Marian apparitions. The life of Benoîte Rencurel (1647-1718), Paris, Hervé Roullet, AVM Diffusion, 2025.
- Germaine Cousin (from Pibrac), the little shepherdess, Paris, Hervé Roullet, AVM Diffusion, 2024.
- Anthony of Padua ou de Lisbonne. Docteur évangélique, thaumaturge et compagnon familier, Paris, Hervé Roullet, AVM Diffusion, 2023.
- Les chrétiennes martyres, depuis le début du christianisme, Paris, Hervé Roullet, AVM Diffusion, 2023.
- L'apparition de la Vierge Marie à La Salette. Marie réconciliatrice. Les vies de Mélanie Calvat et Maximin Giraud. Actualité des secrets, Paris, Hervé Roullet, AVM Diffusion, 2021.
- Joseph of Cupertino. Illetré, thaumaturge et théologien. Le saint qui s'envole devant le pape, Paris, Hervé Roullet, AVM Diffusion, 2020.
- Gemma Galgani, Paris, Hervé Roullet, AVM Diffusion, 2019.
- Lazare et ses soeurs Marthe et Marie, Lazarus of Bethany and his sisters Martha and Mary Magdalene, Paris, Hervé Roullet, AVM Diffusion, 2019.
- Les esprits célestes, the celestial Spirits, Paris, Hervé Roullet, AVM Diffusion, 2019.
- Les Martyrs d'Otrante, The Martyrs of Otranto, Paris, Hervé Roullet, AVM Diffusion, 2018.
- Sainte Mâtie, Paris, Hervé Roullet, AVM Diffusion, 2018.
- Chrétiens et musulmans. Marie porte de l'unité, Éd. Docteur angélique, Avignon, 2018.
- Les sept demeures de Marie (The seven houses of Mary): Nazareth, Jérusalem, Éphèse (House of the Virgin Mary), Lorette (Loreto, Marche)..., Paris, Hervé Roullet, AVM Diffusion, 2018.
- Teresa Margaret of the Sacred Heart, Sainte Thérèse-Marguerite Redi, Une spiritualité du Coeur de Jésus, Coll. "Saints du monde", Éd. Pierre Téqui, Paris, 2017.
- Josephine Bakhita, l'esclave devenue sainte, Paris : Ed. de l'Emmanuel, 2015, Emmanuel Community.
- L'Amour. Le secret des chrétiens, Ed. Salvator, Paris, 2012.
- L'amour et le mal, Ed. L'Œuvre, Paris,2012.
- 1200 mots chrétiens, Éd. Sarment-Jubilé, Paris, 2010.
- La foi catholique avec des mots simples, Éd. Docteur angélique, Avignon, 2010.
- Être laïc et se former dans l'Eglise d'aujourd'hui, Ed. D.F.R, Bordeaux, 2010.
- Il est ressuscité, La foi catholique expliquée à tous, Ed. Soceval-Artège, Perpignan, 2009.
- Marie Reine de l'Amour, Éd. Docteur angélique, Avignon, 2009.
- Saint Etienne (Saint Stephen), premier diacre et premier martyr, Coll. "Saints du monde", Éd. Pierre Téqui, Paris, 2006.
- La renaissance du catéchuménat dans la France contemporaine et à "l'âge d'or" des Pères de l'Église (Church Fathers), Éd. Pierre Téqui, Paris, 2006.

== Discography ==
Piano :

- Scènes marines et champêtres, with some pieces of Jean Cras, Performers : Jean Dubé (musician) et Xavier Bouchaud for the four hands, CD Syrius 2010 réf. SYR 141430.
- Croquis champêtres et voyages oniriques, Jean Martin, piano, CD Syrius 2010 réf. SYR 141433.
- Pieces for piano (Feuilles d'album and The Crown othe Holy Virgin), Marie-Laure Boulanger, piano, CD Hervé Roullet 2019 réf. AVM ROU012.

Chants for mixed chorus : Liturgical works were performed for the first time in the Saint-Louis-en-l'Île church of Paris in 2012–2013, by the vocal Ensemble Via Lucis accompanied on the organ by Jean Galard. Those chants were recorded on two CDs :

- Oeuvres liturgiques, Vol 1, UPC-A: 3760151853791, 2013
- Chants liturgiques pour 4 voix mixtes, Vol 2, UPC-A: 3760151853852, 2013

Edith Weber, professor emeritus at the Sorbonne, UFR of Music and Musicology, wrote in the magazine L'éducation musicale : "These two records show that according to the perspectives opened by the Second Vatican Council (1962-1965), liturgical songs in French are in full swing".

Two other CDs were recorded in 2020, also performed by the vocal Ensemble Via lucis, in the church of the Holy Family of Le Pré-Saint-Gervais, near Paris:

- Spiritual concert: Apocalypse and liturgical song. The CD contains in particular a musical account with all the texts of the Book of Revelation read during the annual liturgical cycle of the Catholic Church. UPC-A: 3760151854729
- Spiritual concert: Songs to the Virgin Mary . The CD contains especially a musical story on the Lourdes apparitions.UPC-A: 3760151854736
