= Conrad Meit =

German sculptor

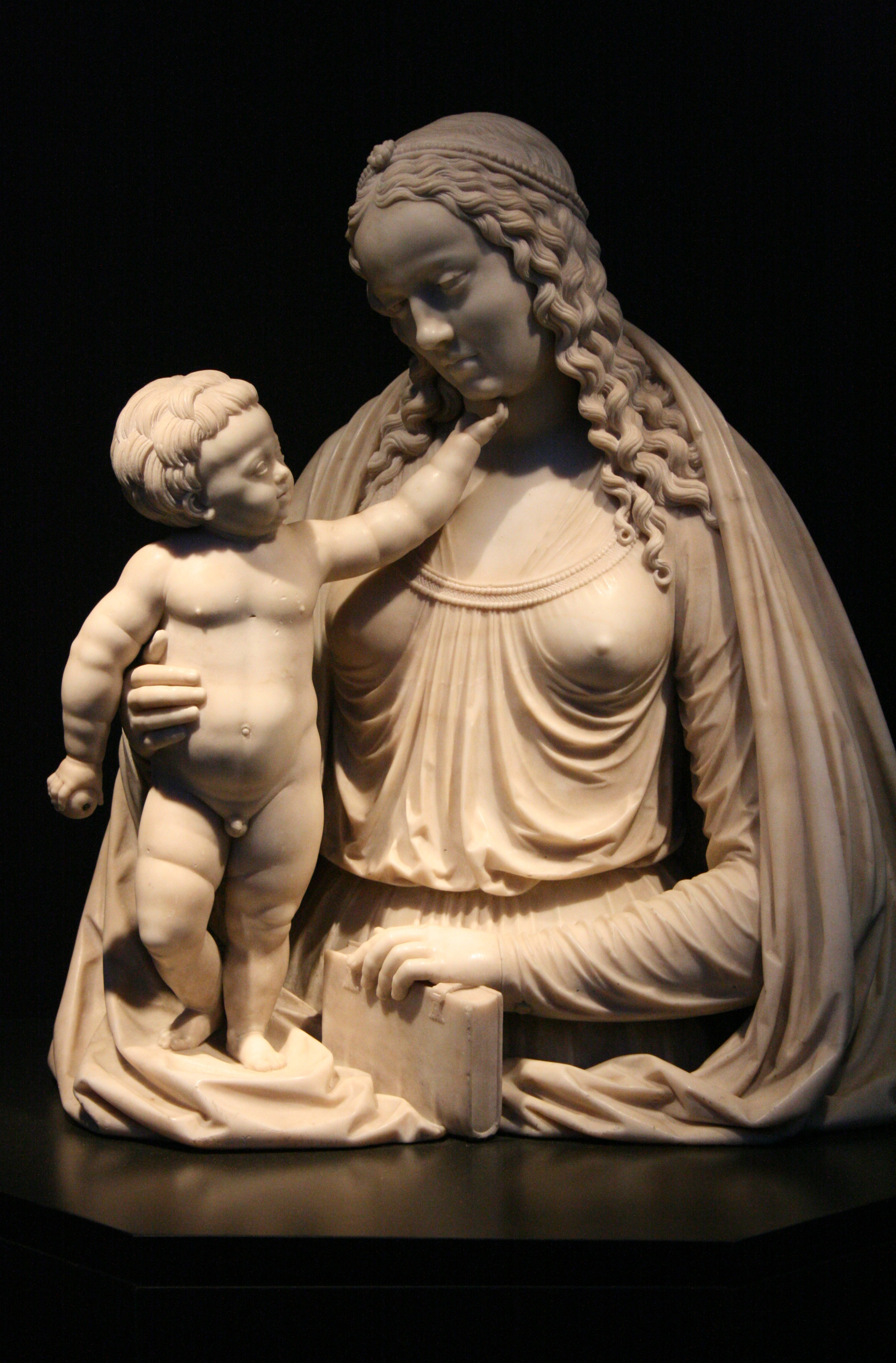
The Madonna and Child made for the tomb of Philibert of Chalon at Lons-le-Saunier, now Brussels Cathedral

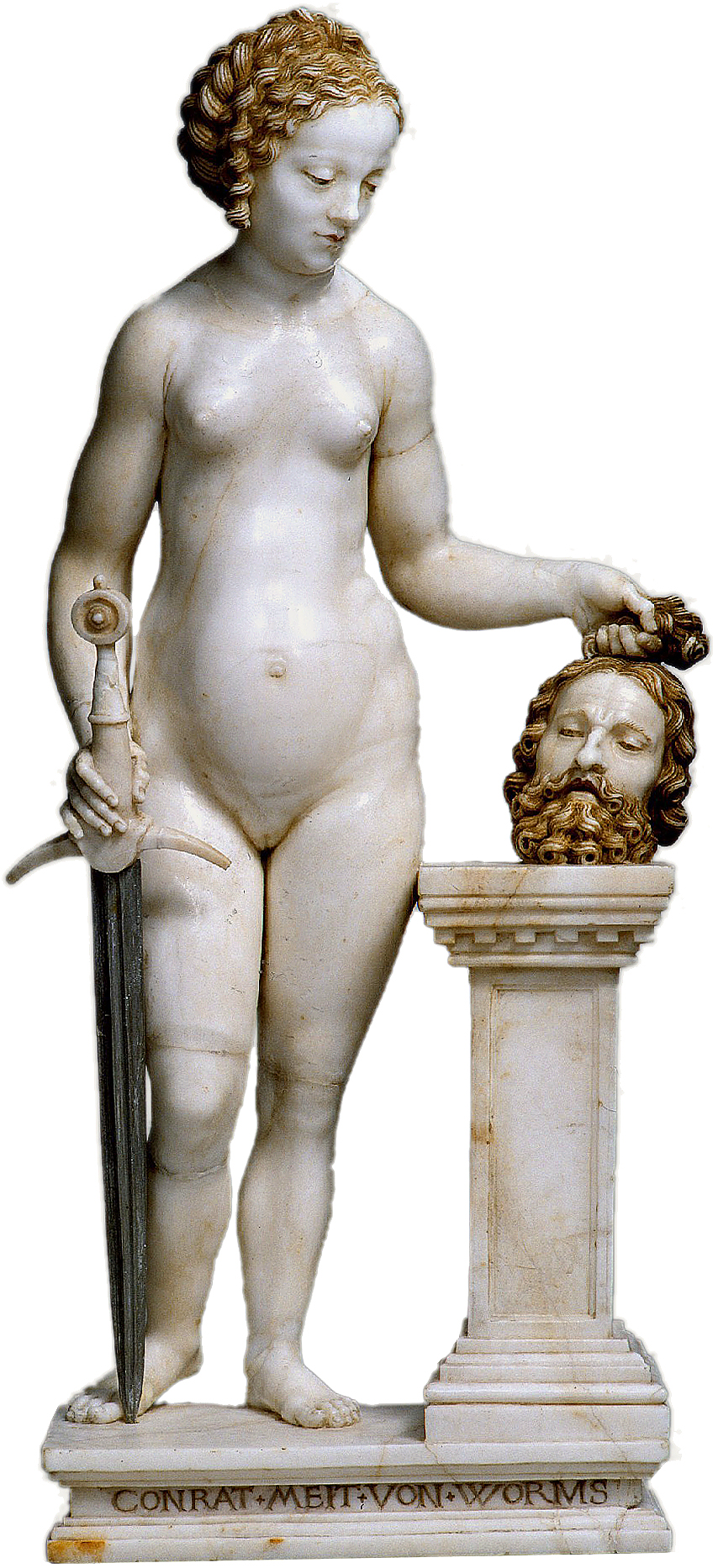
Judith with the Head of Holophernes, c.1525 (alabaster); unusually, this is signed on the base.

Conrad Meit or (usual in German) Conrat Meit (1480s in Worms; 1550/1551 in Antwerp) was a German-born Late Gothic and Renaissance sculptor, who spent most of his career in the Low Countries.

The royal tombs that were his largest works still had elaborate Late Gothic architectural frameworks by others, but Meit's figures were Renaissance in conception and style. Meit's work, with its delicately worked plasticity and pronounced corporality, brought an entirely new form of expression to Late Gothic church sculpture. The anatomy of his nude figures draws more from Albrecht Dürer than from classical sculpture.

Later many of his works in Brussels, Antwerp, Tongerlo Abbey, and elsewhere were destroyed in the Reformation and French Revolution, leaving the three royal monuments at the then newly built Royal Monastery of Brou, Bourg-en-Bresse, as his outstanding surviving large works. A number of small works, including portrait busts in wood, and small statuettes in various materials have survived. The documented tombs and the signed alabaster statuette of Judith (illustrated below) are the main secure works for defining his style.

== Life and works ==
Meit's date of birth at Worms on the Rhine is unknown, and his early life and training are not recorded. He was employed at the court of Frederick III, Elector of Saxony before 1506 and came to work at the Wittenberg court at the request of Lucas Cranach the Elder, where he probably worked in Cranach's workshop between 1505 and 1511. He then went to Middelburg to work for Philip of Burgundy, the illegitimate son of Philip the Good, Duke of Burgundy, who was later to be suddenly made Bishop of Utrecht. From 1514 until her death in 1530 Meit was court sculptor to the Archduchess Margaret of Austria, the regent of the Netherlands, mainly based at Mechelen. In 1534 he moved to Antwerp, buying a house there and joining the Guild of St Luke there in 1536. Works produced by Meit there are documented until 1544, but were all lost to later iconoclasm.

=== Tomb group at Brou ===
For Margaret of Austria Meit made his most famous works, the figures on the group of three monumental royal tombs for Margaret, her husband Philibert II, Duke of Savoy and his mother Margaret of Bourbon, produced from 1526 to 1531. These are at the then newly built Royal Monastery of Brou, Bourg-en-Bresse, today in France, but then in the province of Bresse, part of the Duchy of Savoy. The Late Gothic architectural surrounds were already mostly completed, but not installed, by a Flemish team, and Meit's team added the five life-size effigy figures and the many smaller figures. Meit's team was himself and three assistants, one of whom was his brother. By no means all the carving of the figures seems to be by Meit himself, and for example he does not seem to have carved any of the putti himself, though he may well have designed them.

Philibert had died at the age of 24 in 1504, so Meit's images of him are based on other portraits, and rather idealized. His majestic grave monument is placed in the middle of the Abbey's choir, with the two female tombs set against the wall on either side of it. The three aligned figures are turned towards each other, as though in communication. Though to the side, Margaret's tomb is the largest.

Philibert's tomb consists of two levels and two effigies, one above the other. The upper part, in expensive imported white Carrara marble, represents the Duke in ceremonial costume, surrounded by Italian-style angels (putti). Below this ten small female figures, called the sibyls, point towards the lower effigy, which shows him naked except for a cloth over his genitals. The putti used to be turned to face the effigy, but in a modern restoration several were turned to face outwards.

Margaret of Austria's tomb also has an upper effigy in marble and a lower one in alabaster. In the upper one she is shown as an older woman (she died at 50) in full state dress, wearing the crown-like archducal hat. Below she is shown in her youth, wearing a loose robe with her long hair unbound, and somewhat idealized. The two lower figures of the married couple vary the normal "transi" or cadaver tomb iconography, where a lower figure is shown as decayed remains, and connects to a broader theme of Resurrection in the abbey's art. Below their formal effigies, the couple are shown in their most perfect state, as they would be at the resurrection of the dead.

To the north, the tomb of Margaret of Bourbon consists of a single effigy placed within an enfeu and lying upon a piece of black marble, with pleurants beneath, a traditional Burgundian feature. The princess is dressed in an ermine cloak and her feet rest on a greyhound, symbol of loyalty. Behind the effigy, putti bear escutcheons with the initials of Margaret and her husband.

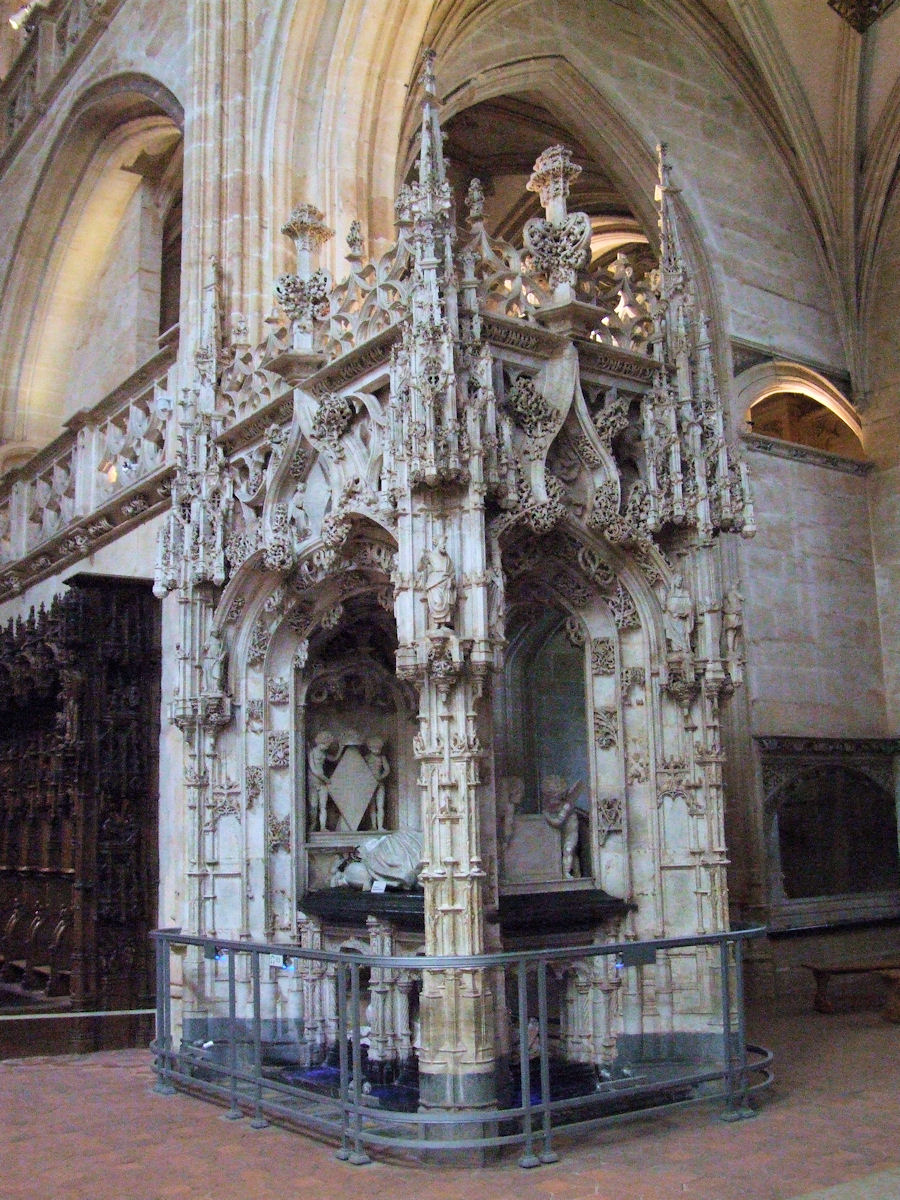
Margaret of Austria's tomb

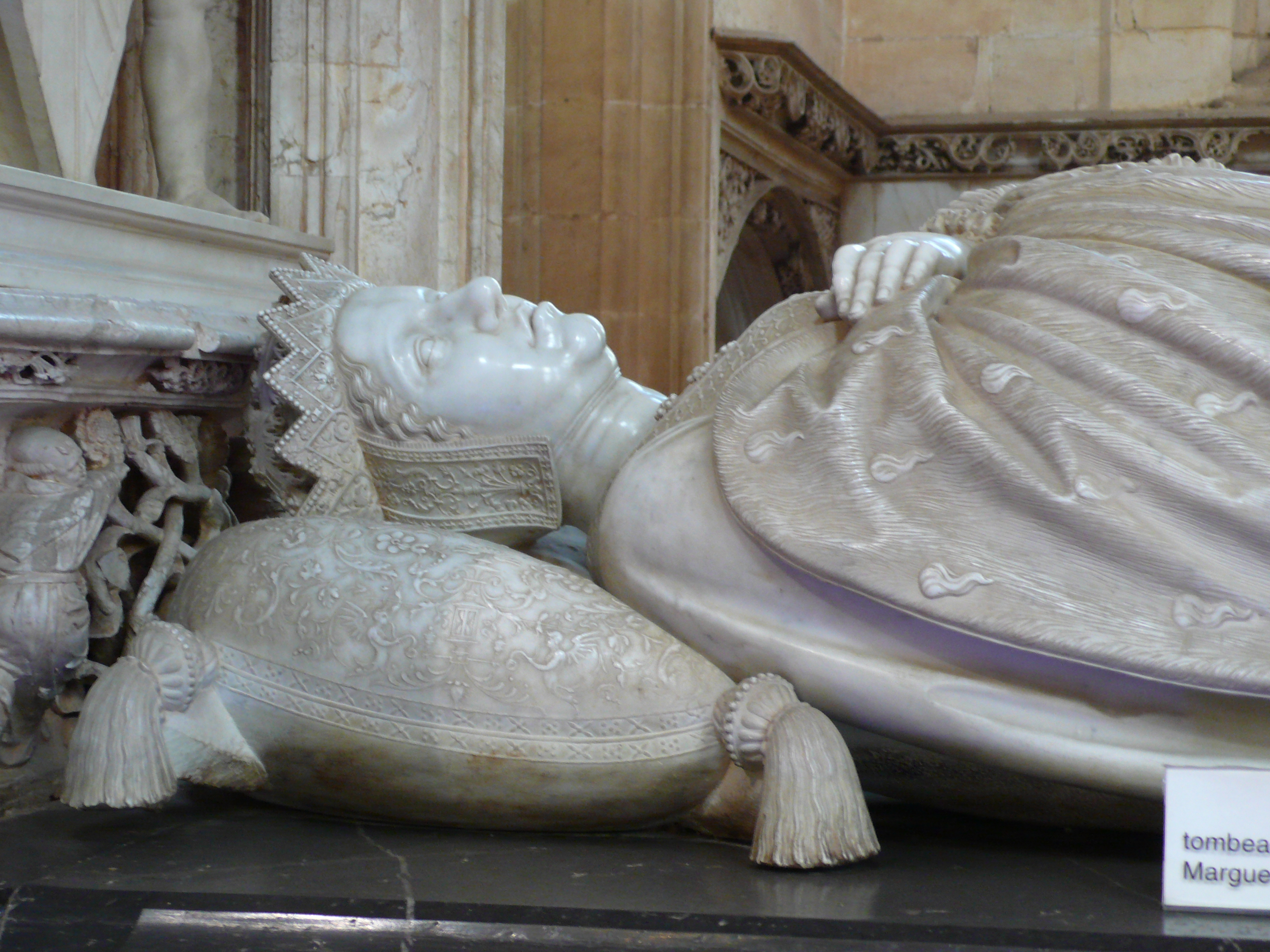
Margaret of Austria, upper effigy

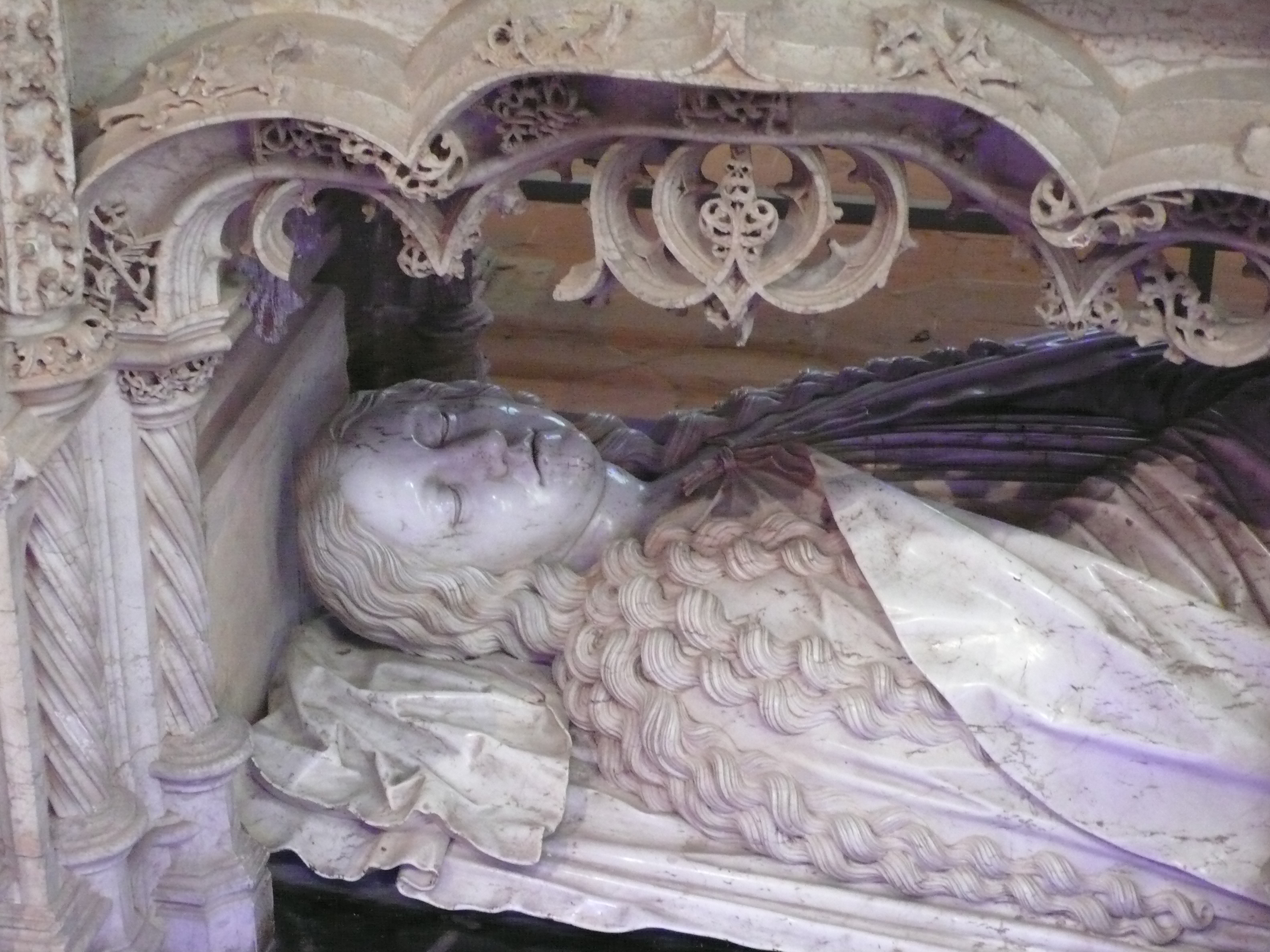
Margaret of Austria, lower effigy

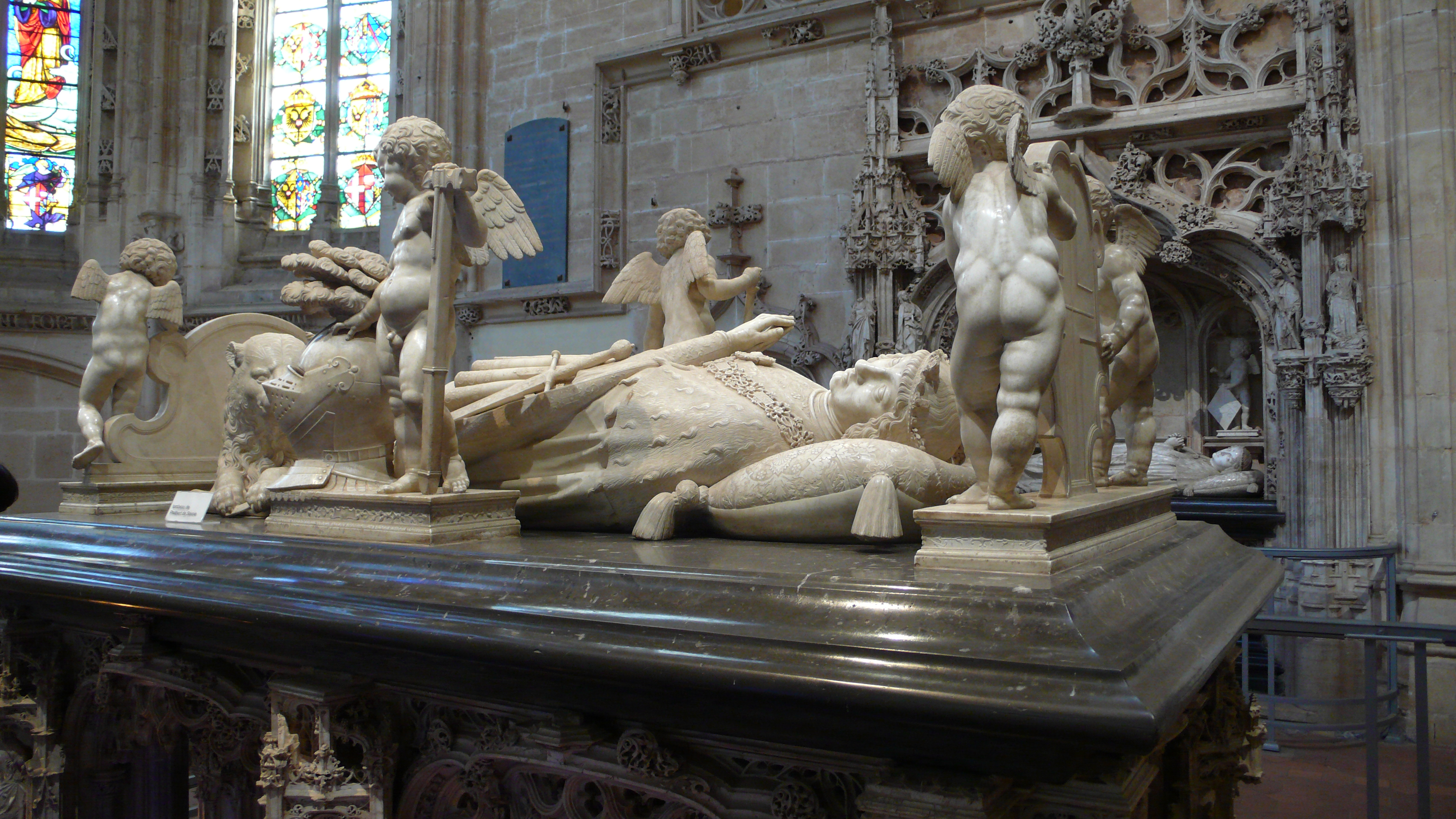
Top level of Philibert's tomb

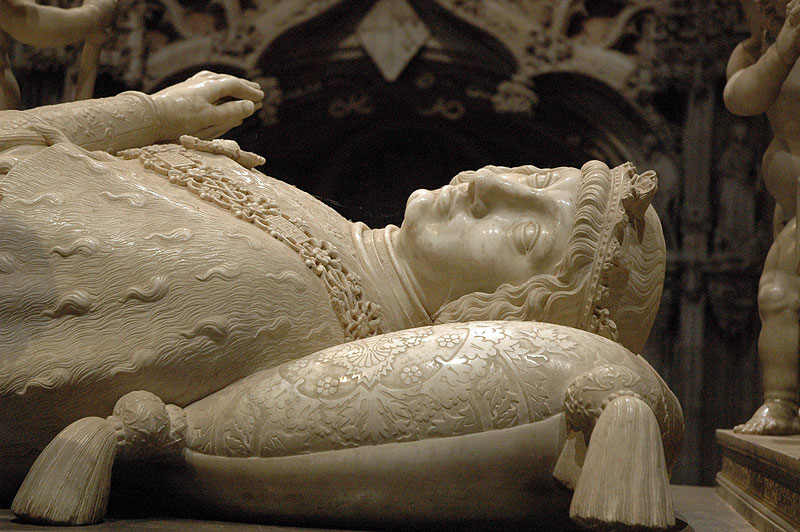
Philibert's upper effigy

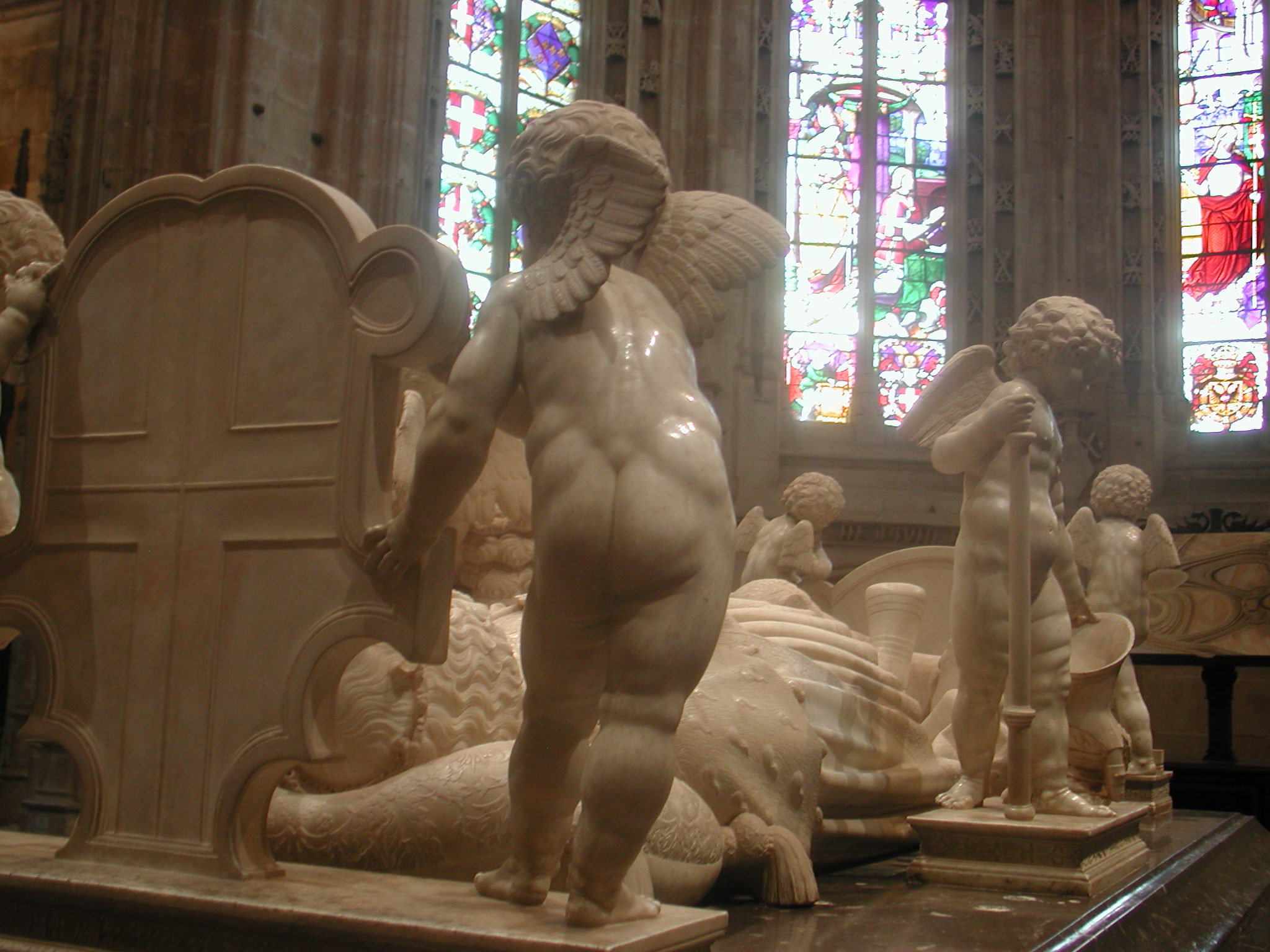
Putti around Philibert's tomb

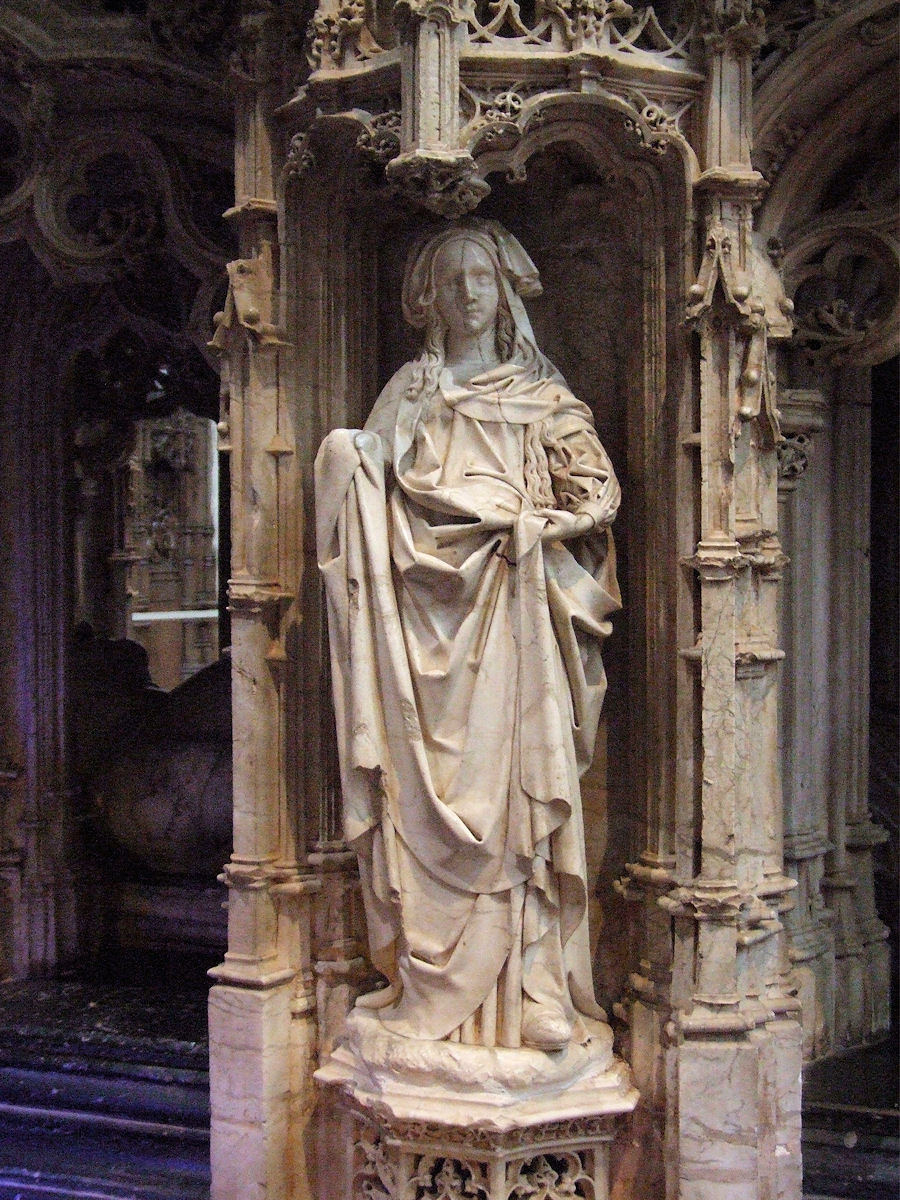
One of the Sibyl figures on the base of Philibert's tomb

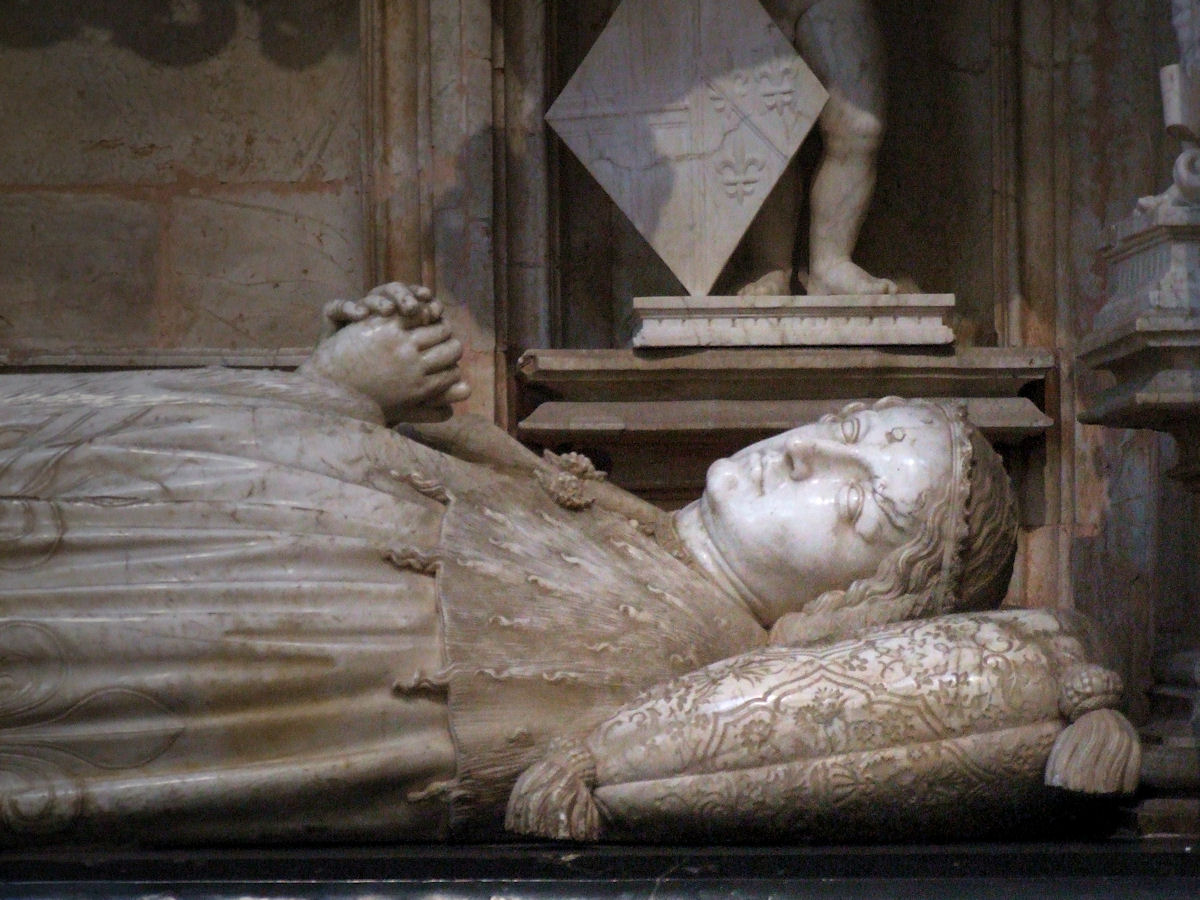
Margaret of Bourbon's effigy

=== Other large works ===
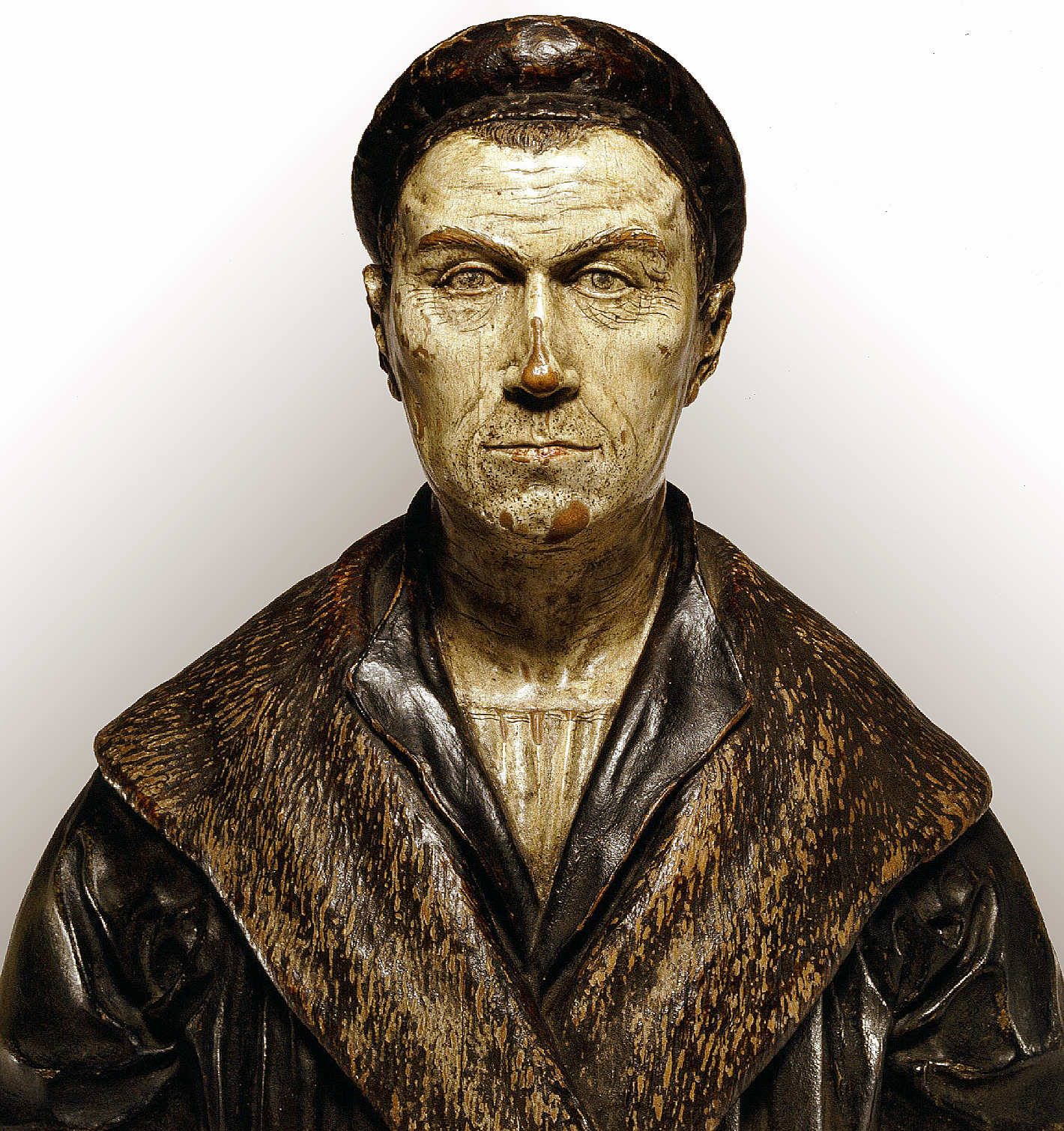
Bust in painted pearwood of the financier Jakob Fugger, c.1512–15

When the young Philibert of Chalon, Prince of Orange died in war on 3 August 1530, his mother Philiberta of Luxembourg decided to honour him in the most grandiose way possible. After a princely funeral at Lons-le-Saunier on 25 October 1530, she hired Conrad Meit and another famous artist of the time, Jean-Baptiste Mario of Florence, to create a fitting tomb. They began work at the church of Cordeliers de Lons-le-Saunier immediately after completing work on the tombs at Brou Abbey. Work on Philibert's unfinished tomb was abandoned in 1534 after Philiberta died and a fire destroyed the church; a portion remained visible in 1637 but it was later completely destroyed. The work included 25 life-size statues, now lost, and the Virgin and Child now at Brussels Cathedral. Another project for Tongerloo Abbey, just outside Antwerp, included 16 life-size statues, now lost, for which he received a payment in 1542.

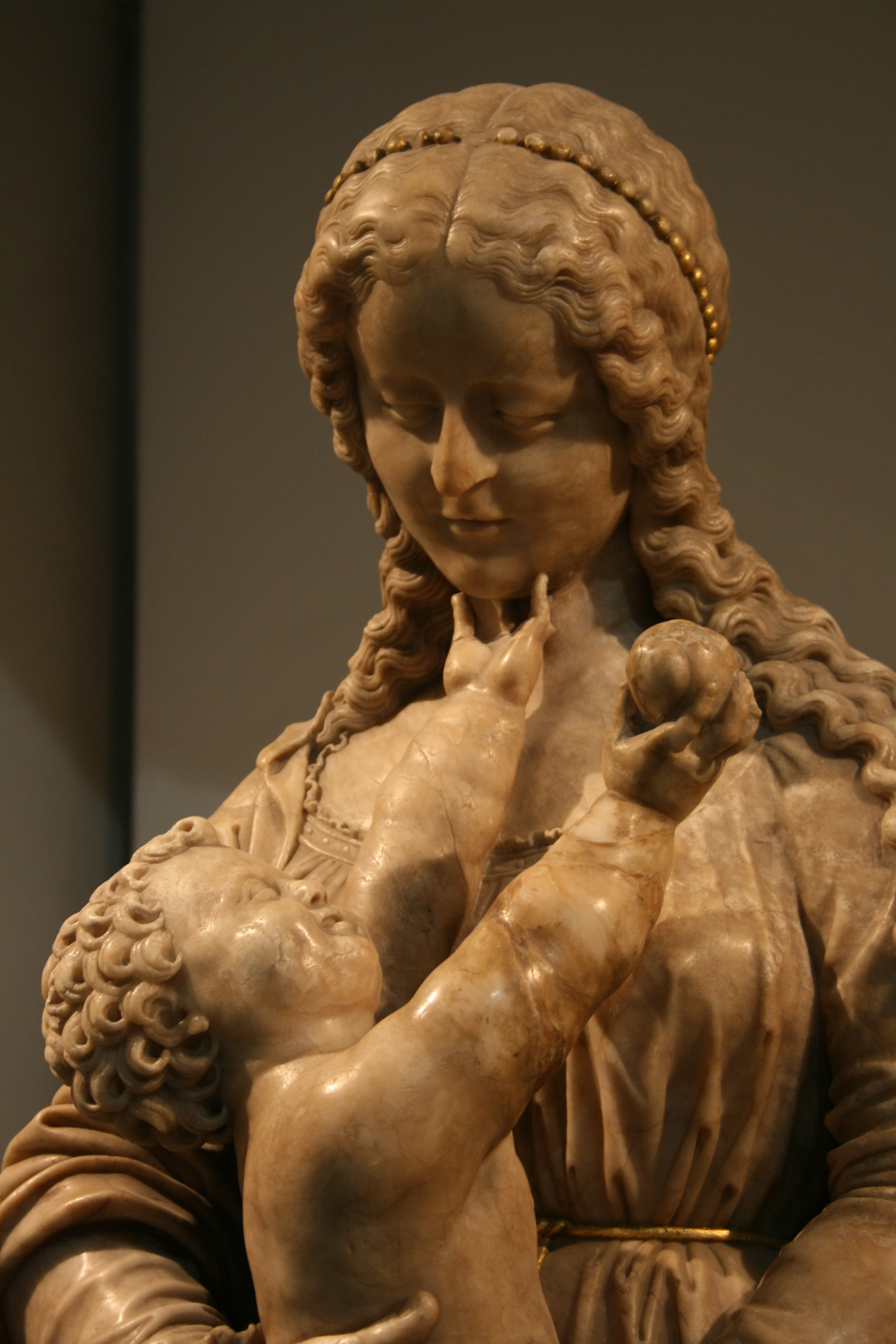
Vierge à l'enfant, v.1530, Musée de la Tour Abbatiale, Saint-Amand-les-Eaux

He also carved a Pietà, now in Besançon Cathedral, at the request of Margaret of Austria's chaplain, the Abbot Antoine de Montécut. The abbey of Saint Vincent de Besançon received it from the Abbot and displayed it in a small chapel dedicated to Our Lady of Sorrows. Among his other works are two sculptures of Mary holding the baby Jesus, one at the Cathedral of St. Michael and St. Gudula in Brussels, and the other at the Benedictine Abbey in Saint-Amand-les-Eaux.

=== Portraits and statuettes ===
From surviving letters, Margaret had initially sought out Meit for his reputation as a portraitist, and he produced a range of portraits of her and her many relations. A terracotta bust of her nephew Charles V is now kept at the Gruuthuse Museum, Bruges. He produced a great quantity of small sculptures in bronze and boxwood, with some of the nudes, such as Adam and Eve (there are a number of pairs) and Judith with the Head of Holophernes, often similar in style to the paintings of Cranach. A striking wood Lucretia in the Metropolitan Museum of Art, New York, is in a more expressive style. There is also an early Falconer in Vienna, and a wood Entombment in Munich. Together, these works look forward to later small-scale sculpture in the German Renaissance.

Meit's portraits of Margaret varied between those showing her at the age when her husband was still alive, before Meit knew her, and those showing her at her age when they were made, and also reflect her different roles as Regent, archduchess, widow and family member. Some remain in the main Habsburg collections in Vienna. There are also small boxwood busts of Philibert and Margaret in the Waddesdon Bequest in the British Museum, with similar ones in Berlin and Munich; a larger pair in marble, for her library, are now lost. An alabaster head, perhaps representing Cicero, is in the Getty Museum. There are bronzes, which are probably designed by Meit but with others doing the casting.

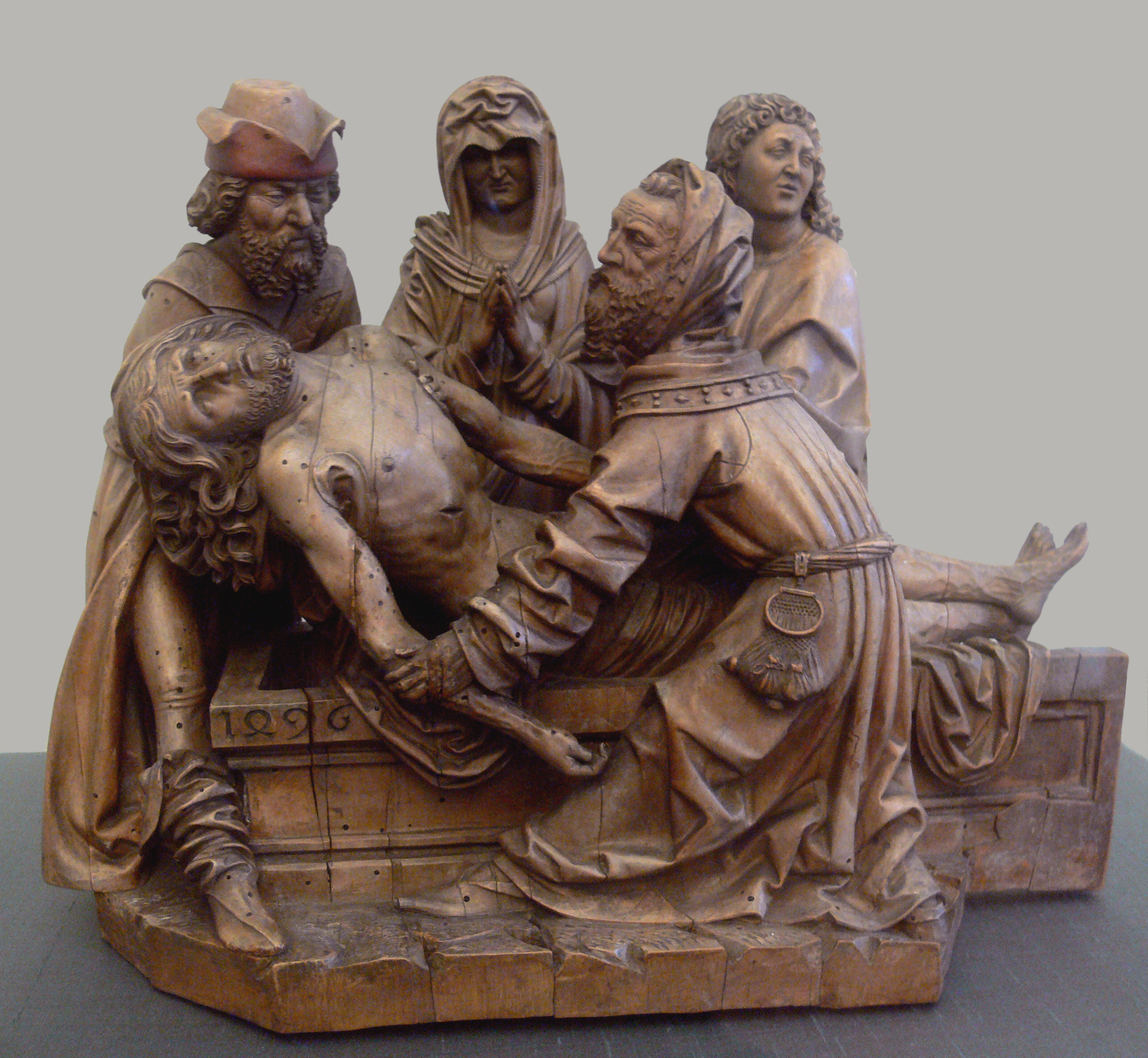
Wood Entombment in Munich, dated 1496

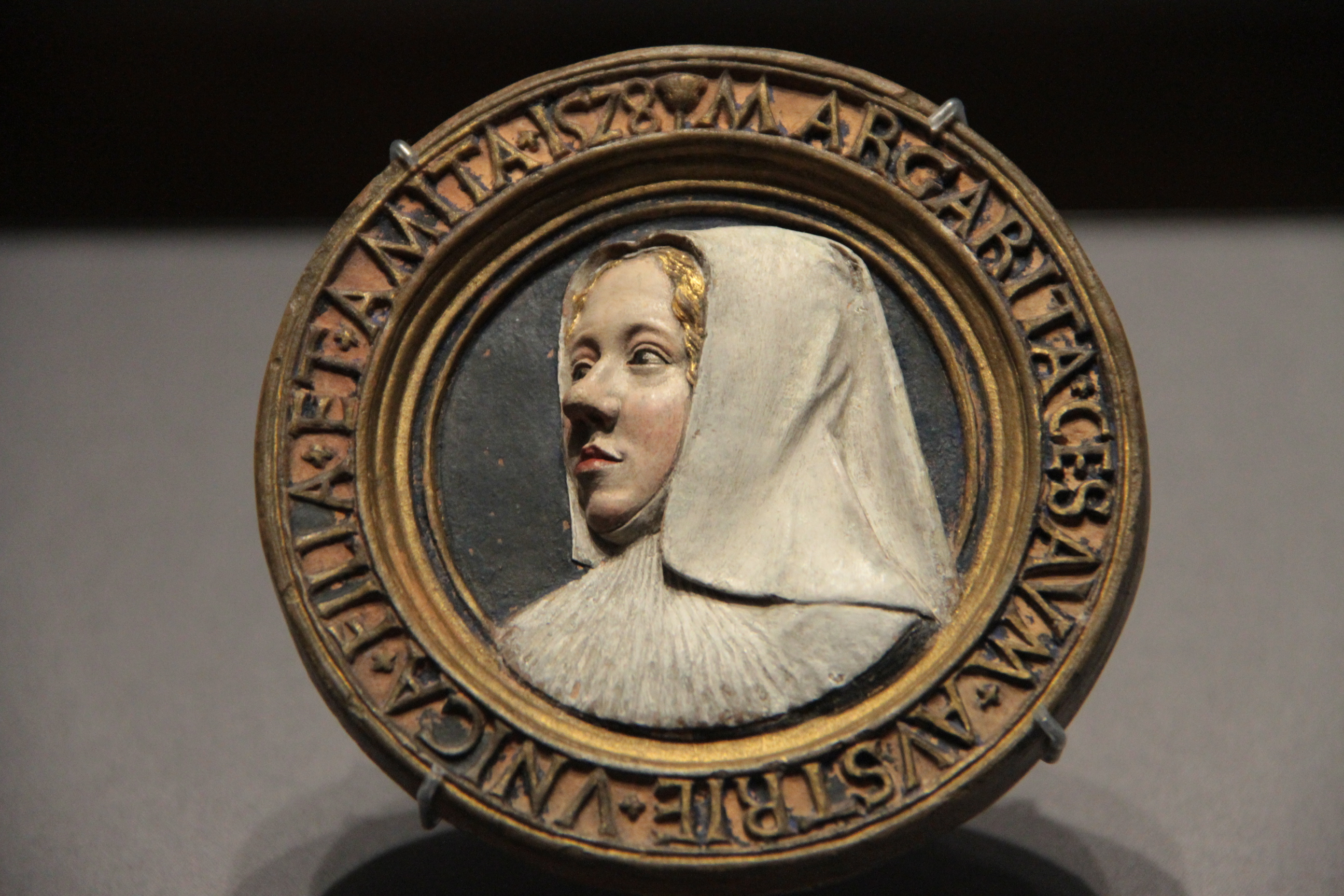
Margaret of Austria in painted wood, Vienna

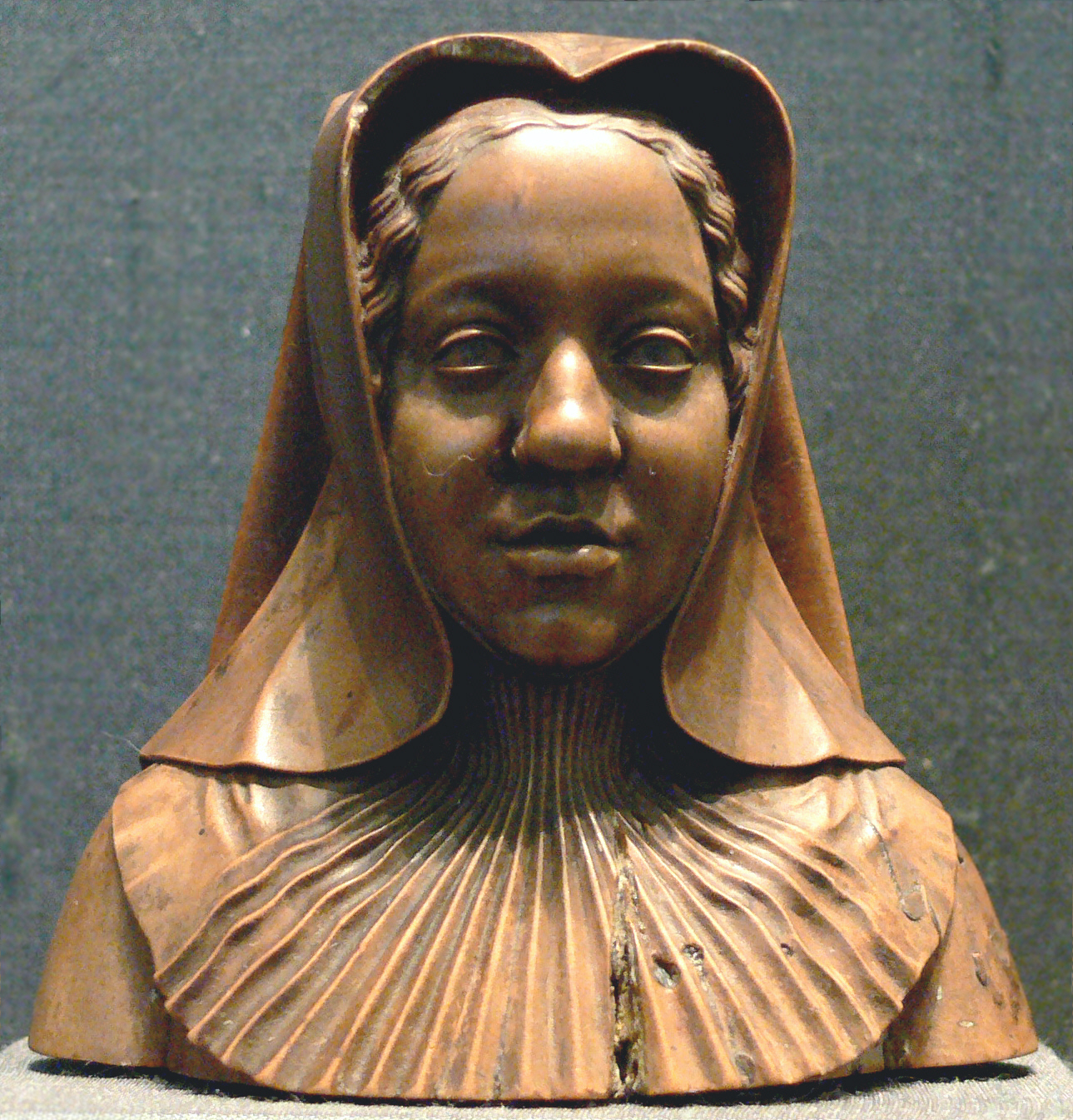
Margaret of Austria, c. 1518, Munich

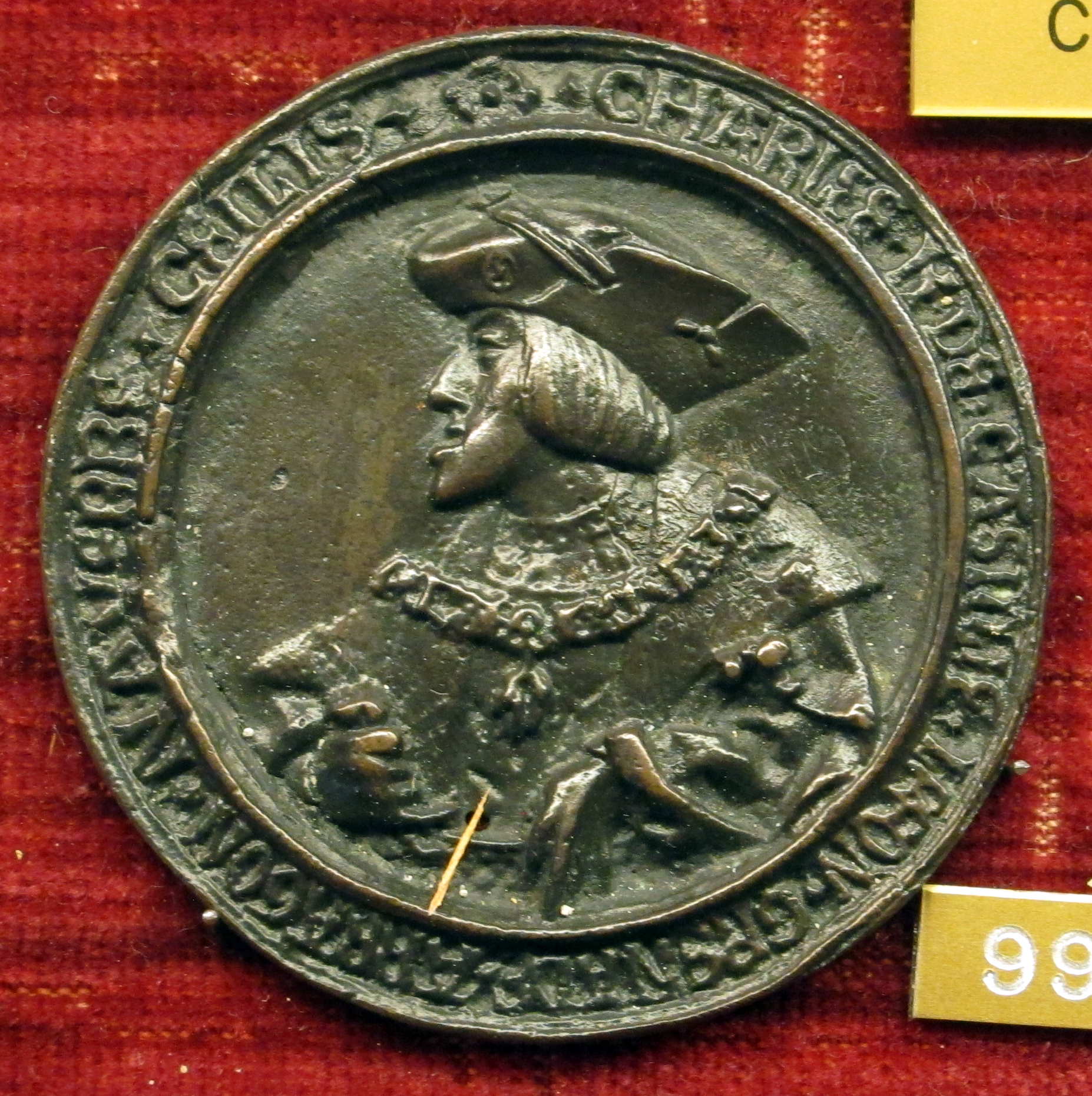
Medal of Emperor Charles V, about 1520

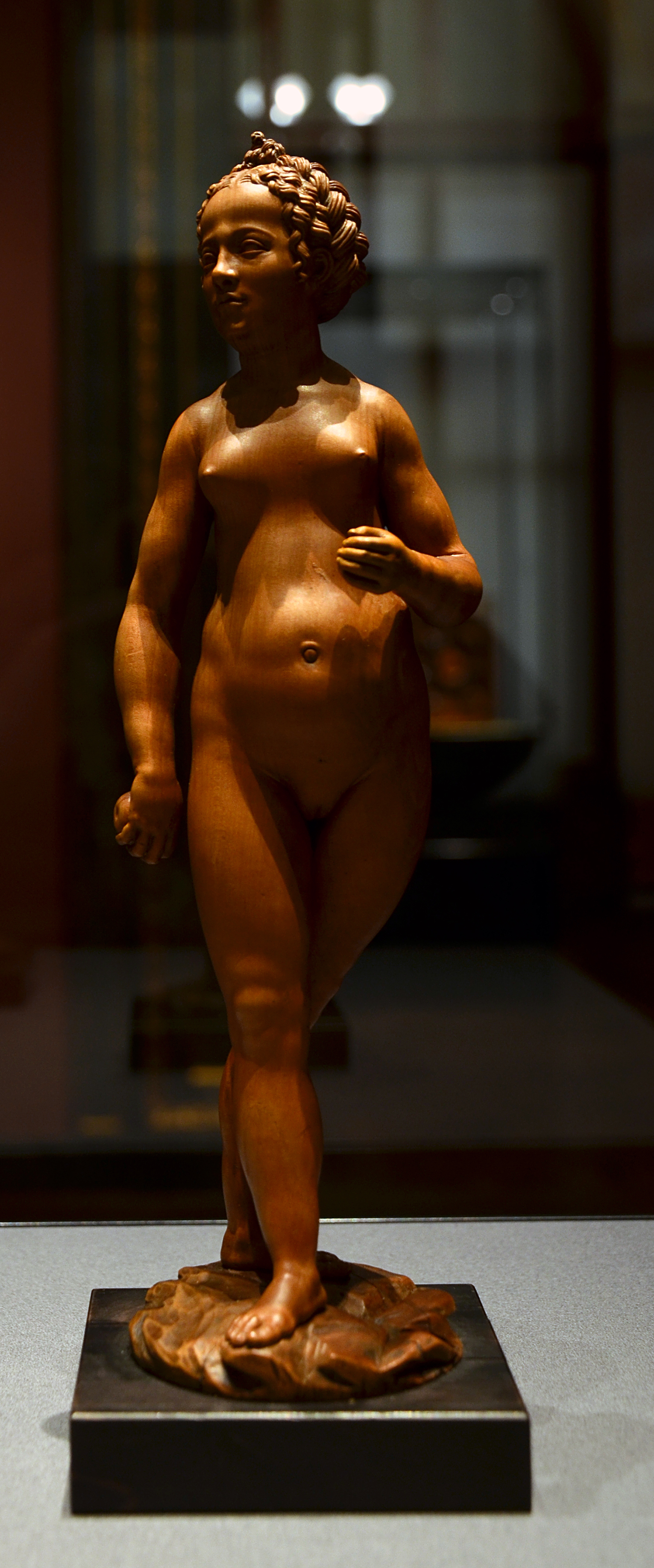
Eve, in boxwood, c. 1530, Vienna

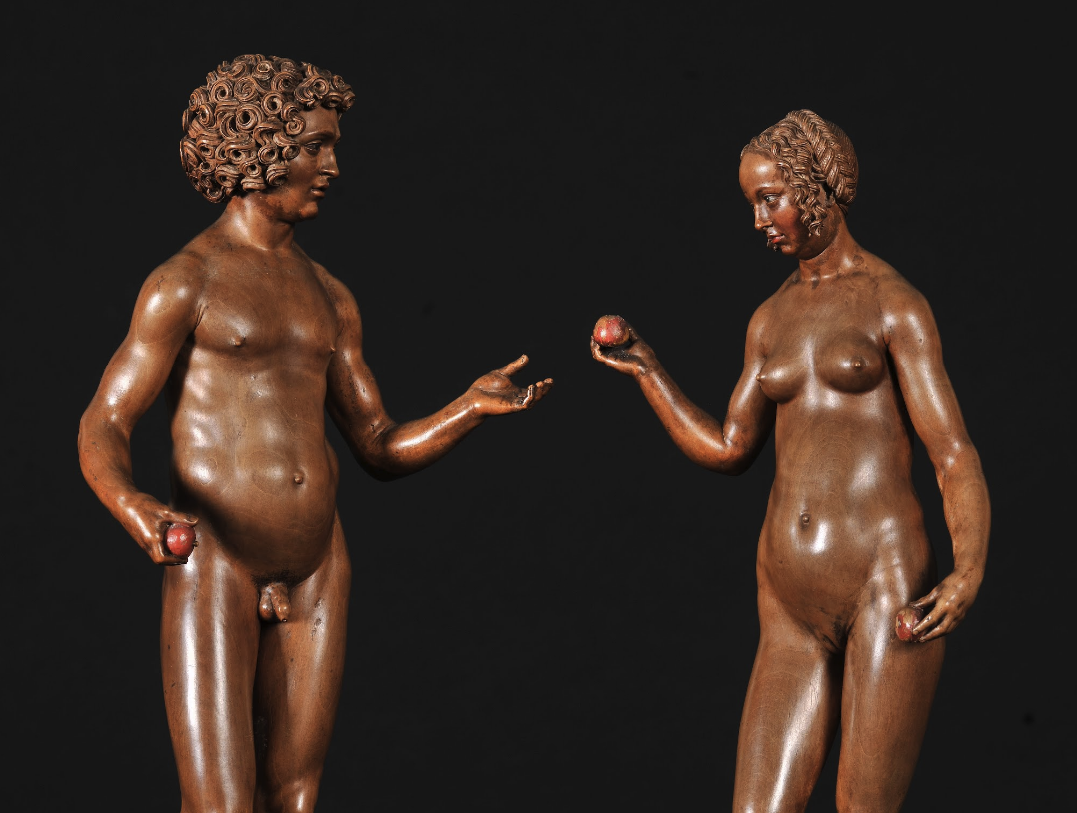
Adam and Eve, c. 1510-1517, in boxwood

== Fame ==
Meit placed his own portrait bust in the library of Margaret of Austria at Malines, which can be seen as a significant step in the development of the status of the artist. Meit's work was valued by both Albrecht Dürer, who met him in the Netherlands in 1520–21, and may also have known him from Germany, and Lucas Cranach the Elder. Dürer referred to him as the ...gute[…] bildtschniczer mit nahmen Conrad, desgleichen ich kein gesehen hab, der dienet des kaisers tochter, frau Margareth (the good sculptor named Conrad, the like of which I have not seen, who served the Emperor's daughter, lady Margaret). His reputation as an important sculptor stretched across the whole of northern Europe in the early Renaissance, but after his death both he and his sitters were lost to memory, unidentified by inscriptions on the works, and one figure was recorded in the 17th century as by Dürer, of an unidentified figure.

It did not help that many works were lost, and that he memorialized the last of the Chalons Princes of Orange in the Brou tombs, and that these soon became sited in French territory, ruled by kings with no family interest in those buried there. Interest in his work revived in the late 20th century, especially in his statuettes, where "sculpture exists for its own sake in a manner unprecedented in the north, with no relation to or support by architecture".
