= Elena Guerra =

Italian Catholic religious sister (1835–1914)

Saint Elena Guerra OSS
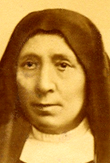

Virgin
- Born: 23 June 1835; Lucca, Duchy of Lucca
- Died: 11 April 1914 (aged 78); Lucca, Kingdom of Italy
- Venerated in: Roman Catholic Church
- Beatified: 26 April 1959, Saint Peter's Basilica, Vatican City by Pope John XXIII
- Canonized: 20 October 2024 by Pope Francis
- Feast: 11 April, 23 May (Lucca)

Elena Guerra, OSS (23 June 1835 – 11 April 1914) was an Italian Catholic religious sister who founded the Oblates of the Holy Spirit. Guerra was a strong proponent of the Holy Spirit as a motivation to do pious works. She dedicated her life particularly to the education of Chinese and African girls.

== Life ==
Elena Guerra was born into a wealthy, aristocratic family in Lucca on 23 June 1835 as one of six children to Antonio Guerra and Faustina Franceschi. In her childhood she was known to be talented but timid in nature. Guerra made her Confirmation on 5 June 1843.

Guerra first worked with the Vincentians, caring for the poor and the sick. Cholera struck Lucca in 1853 and she tended to the ill after her parents granted her permission to do so. Guerra studied French as well as music and art but also learned Latin and the lives and works of the Church Fathers during an illness that spanned from 1857 to 1864 as she could not leave the house because of it. In 1866 she established a lay association dedicated to the education of girls, under the patronage of the Virgin Mary, St. Joseph and the patroness of Lucca, St. Zita. One of Guerra's students was Gemma Galgani.

Guerra travelled to Rome in 1870 to attend a session of the First Vatican Council, which Pope Pius IX had convened. Guerra and her father made an Easter pilgrimage there in April 1870 and visited the tomb of Saint Peter before she was able to meet with the pope on 23 June 1870. In 1885 she wrote Pope Leo XIII and asked him to rekindle in the faithful devotion to the Holy Spirit. Leo XIII responded with an apostolic letter (Provida matris caritate). Encouraged, Guerra wrote thirteen letters to Leo between 1895 and 1903. Leo issued the encyclical Divinum illud munus in 1897, in which he established the novena to the Holy Spirit to be prayed between the Feast of the Ascension and Pentecost. He followed this in 1902, with a letter to the bishops, Ad fovendum in Christiano populo.

Leo XIII granted Guerra a private audience on 18 October 1897 in which he encouraged her work and renamed her association. It was at some stage that she corresponded with Arnold Janssen regarding a "militia of the Holy Spirit" that would be dedicated to working against the Freemasons. In August 1906 the Archbishop of Lucca told her that he would not permit her prospective religious to make their vows unless Guerra resigned as the congregation's leader. She did so after reflection, moreso in light of friction with some sisters regarding her leadership. The community finally received papal approval from Pope Pius X on 6 March 1911.

Pius X issued a pontifical decree of coronation on 9 September 1904 to place a diadem of stars on the venerated image of the Blessed Virgin of the Immaculate Conception enshrined at the community's monastery.

Guerra died on 11 April 1914 (on Holy Saturday). Her relics are kept in the church of Sant'Agostino in Lucca. The congregation continues its work with houses in nations such as Iran and the Philippines amongst others; in 2008 there were 232 members of the congregation in 36 houses across the globe.

== Beatification ==
Guerra's spiritual writings received theological approval on 21 May 1935. The beatification process commenced in Lucca on 5 May 1936, and Guerra was granted the title of Servant of God. Two local processes were held on a diocesan level and were both ratified on 13 April 1945 after documents were sent to the Congregation for Rites. An antepreparatory committee approved the documents pertaining to the cause on 26 June 1951 as did a preparatory one on 20 January 1953 and a general committee on 21 April 1953. Pope Pius XII approved her life of heroic virtue and proclaimed her Venerable on 26 June 1953.

Two investigations into two alleged miracles were held and were both validated and ratified on 16 October 1953. The miracle was soon approved (after passing several boards) and allowed for Pope John XXIII to celebrate her beatification on 26 April 1959 in Saint Peter's Basilica. 5000 of her own congregation attended the beatification celebration. The apostolic letter Renovanis faciem terrae' was the document that authorized the beatification, signed by Cardinal Secretary of State Domenico Tardini.

St. John Bosco referred to Guerra as a "golden pen" in reference to her spiritual writings. When John XXIII beatified her, he called her a "modern day apostle of the Holy Spirit".

== Canonization ==
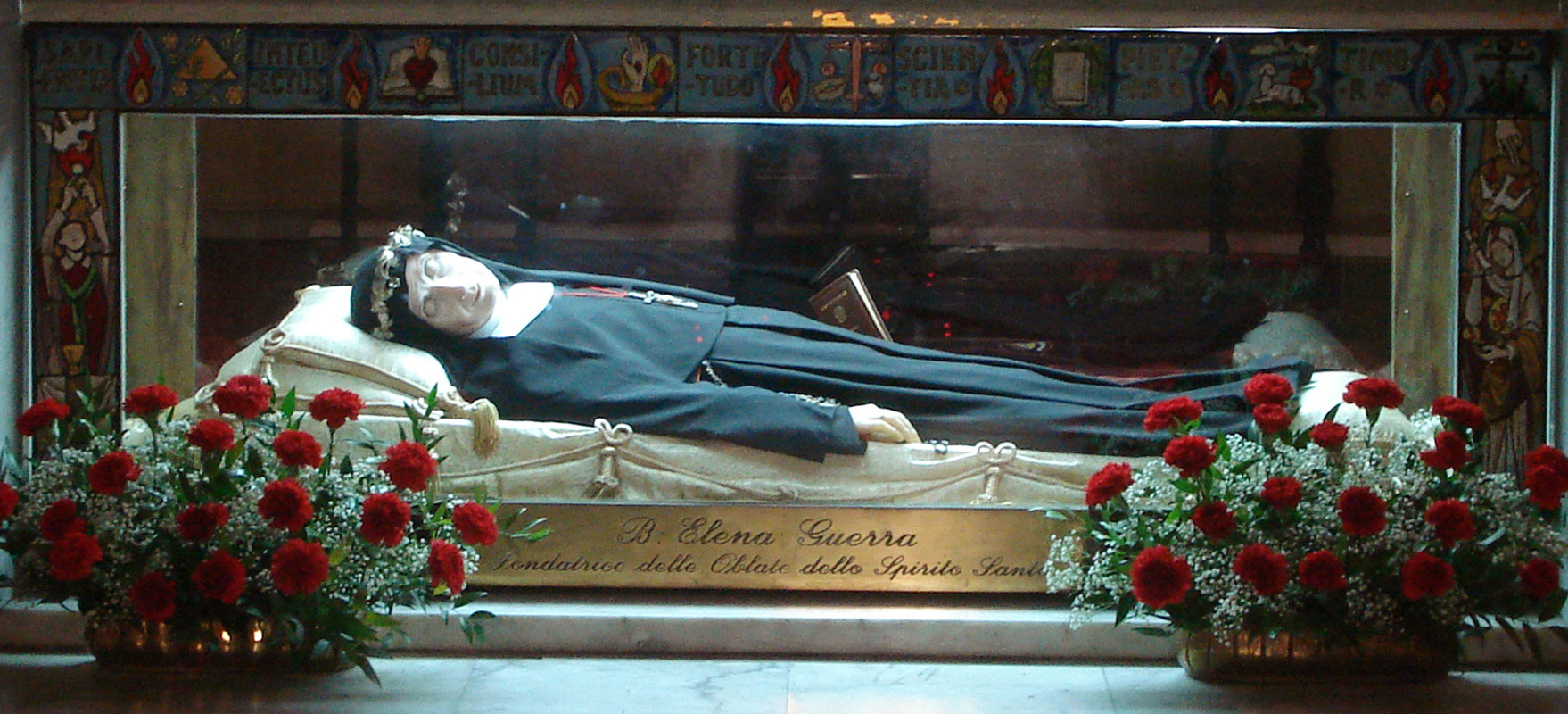
Reliquary of Saint Elena Guerra in the church of Sant'Agostino in Lucca.

On April 13, 2024, Pope Francis met in audience with the cardinal Marcello Semeraro, prefect of the Dicastery for the Causes of Saints, and recognized the miracle necessary for Guerra's canonization. In 2010, Paulo was miraculously healed in Uberlândia after he fell into a coma due to brain injury. He was suffering from pneumonia and hepatitis and the doctors announced his brain death after he underwent a failed craniotomy and decompression.

Guerra was canonised by Pope Francis on October 20, 2024, among the 14 blesseds.
