= Jean Dubé (musician) =

Canadian concert pianist

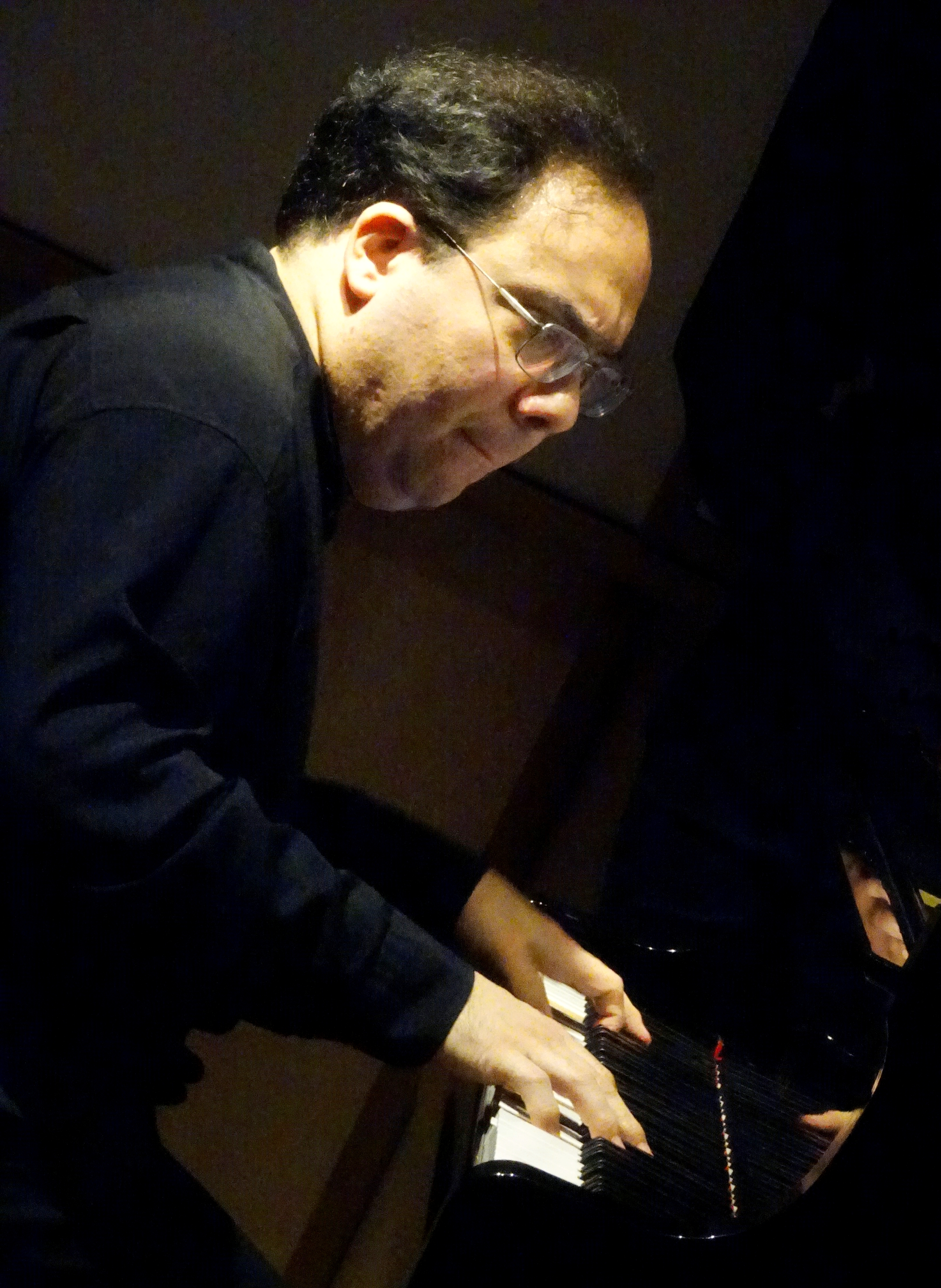
- Dubé in 2022

Background information
- Born: 3 December 1981 (age 44); Edmonton, Canada
- Occupation: Concert pianist
- Instrument: Piano
- Website: www.jeandubepiano.org

Jean Dubé (born December 3, 1981) is a Canadian-French concert pianist. In 2002 he won the International Franz Liszt Piano Competition.

== Life and career ==
Born in Edmonton, Alberta, Dubé began playing piano at the age of three, and played in public at age four. A child prodigy, he won a Steinway piano at the age of nine during the national competition "Jeunes Prodiges Mozart à Paris". The same year, he played as a soloist at the Maison de la Radio with the Radio France Philharmonic Orchestra, live on France Musique.

At the age of 10, he won the first prize in piano at the Nice Conservatory. He became both the youngest soloist in France and the youngest first prize winner in the history of this conservatory. When he was 11 years old, he was unanimously accepted with the jury's highest praise into Jacques Rouvier's class at the National Conservatory of Paris. He was then the youngest musician at the institution.

At just 14, he won the first prize in piano at the National Conservatory of Music and Dance of Paris, as well as the Monique de la Bruchollerie Special Prize.

At the age of 16, he received first prize at the Francis-Poulenc International Piano Competition in Brive-la-Gaillarde (1997). The following year, at 17, he won first prize at the Jeunesses Musicales in Bucharest (1998).

In April 2002, at the age of 21, Jean Dubé won the sixth edition of the International Franz Liszt Piano Competition in Utrecht, as well as the audience prize. He recorded his first CD with Naxos and embarked on a tour of over ninety concerts in more than twenty countries as part of the prize from this competition.

He regularly collaborates with lecturer Julia Le Brun, a specialist in opera. He is also one of the artistic directors of Concertino.

He likes to associate other arts with music and give themed recitals. His interpretation of the Turangalîlâ was the best show of the year in 2000 in Riga and that of Liszt's 2nd Hungarian Rhapsody won in 2002 the fastest replay in the history of Radio Chicago. Unanimous First Prize of the National Conservatory of Paris at the age of 14 under Jacques Rouvier, he studied with Jacqueline Robin, Catherine Collard and with John O'Conor in Dublin, thanks to a full year Yvonne Lefébure scholarship. Winner of the European Piano Competition Ouistreham Riva 2009, which also awarded him the Chopin Association Prize in Nohant.

In 2013, he was invited to the Festival de la Roque d'Anthéron, where he performed works by Liszt, Bellini, Wagner, and Gounod.

He plays as a soloist, in chamber music groups and with many large orchestras. He recorded the Liszt Sonata in addition to a CD dedicated to Native American Indian music for the Syrius label. He collaborates with Julia Le Brun, and is one of the artistic directors at Concertino.

Invited as a jury member of international competitions (Pinerolo 2004, Poulenc 2008, Chang Chun 2009, Franz Liszt Utrecht 2019), he also gives master classes around the world. Also passionate about film music, he has made numerous transcriptions for the piano. He has recorded already over 50 CD recordings, mainly with Syrius, BNL and Naxos labels.

In September 2024, Jean performed the complete 27 studies by Frédéric Chopin in Salle Gaveau in Paris.

== Discography ==
2002 : Franz Liszt : Ballades, polonaises, Trois morceaux suisses (Naxos 8.557364)

2003 : Franz Liszt : Les Préludes, La Campanella, Rhapsodie hongroise n°2 (Syrius 141377)

2004 : César Franck : Œuvres et arrangements pour piano, Préludes (Syrius 141383)

2005 : Jean Sibelius : Œuvres pour piano, Finlandia, Valse triste, vol. 1 (Syrius 141386)

2006 : Jean Cras : L'Œuvre pour piano, Paysages, Danze, Poèmes intimes (Syrius 141393)

2007 : Bach... In Nomine, Beethoven, Liszt, Mendelssohn, Prokofiev, Villa-Lobos... (Syrius 141402)

2007 : 18 Toccatas : Bach, Purcell, Scarlatti, Debussy, Poulenc, Ravel... (Syrius 141406)

2007 : Grieg : Sonate op. 36 ; Rachmaninov : Sonate op. 19, avec Adrien Frasse-Sombet (violoncelle) (Syrius 141409)

2008 : Maurice Ravel, Sonate posthume, Sonate ; César Franck, Sonate en la majeur, avec Amanda Favier (violon) (Syrius 141422)

2009 : Jean Cras et Hervé Roullet : Scènes maritimes et champêtres, avec Xavier Bouchaud (deuxième piano) (Syrius 141430)

2009 : Jean Sibelius : Œuvres pour piano, vol.2 (Syrius 141432)

2010 : Hyacinthe Jadin : Six sonates pour piano (Syrius 141437)

2010 : Frédéric Chopin (Syrius 141438)

2010 : Johannes Brahms : Trio Esterhaza, avec Frédéric Pelassy (violon) et Florent Audibert (violoncelle) (BNL 112966)

2011 : Barcarolles : Chopin, Fauré, Liszt, Mendelssohn, Ravel, Sibelius... (Syrius 141443)

2011 : Jehan Alain: Œuvres pour piano, Préludes, Nocturnes, Barcarolle, Petite rhapsodie...(Syrius 141447)

2012 : Liszt voyageur : La Suisse et l'Italie (Intégrale Liszt, vol. 1) (CEA Musika)

2012 : "Main gauche" : Debussy, Dubé, Saint-Saëns, Scriabine, Sibelius... (BNL 112969)

2012 : Piano-Pédalier : Œuvres pour piano-pédalier de Alkan, Dubois, Franck, Liszt (Syrius 141446)

2012 : Jean-Paul Penin : Paris 1930, 12 valses pour piano (Syrius 141453)

2012 : Erkki Melartin : Œuvres pour piano, vol. 1 (BNL 112970)

2013 : Paraphrases russes : Balakirev, Rimski-Korsakov, Dubé, Pabst (Syrius 141454)

2014 : Edvard Grieg et Christian Sinding : Œuvres pour piano (Syrius 141456)

2014 : Demis Visvikis : Les Astres, trilogie pour piano (Syrius 141462)

2015 : Louis Vierne : Œuvres pour piano (Syrius 141448)

2015 : Danses au rythme des époques : Albéniz, Brahms, Ravel Joplin, Piazzolla, avec Lucienne Lovano (alto) (Studiogold)

2016 : Alexandre Glazounov : Pièces pour piano (Syrius 141467)

2016 : Franz Liszt, Sonate en si ; August Stradal, Fantaisie sur Christus de Liszt (Syrius 141469)

2017 : Sur des airs amérindiens (Syrius 141480)

2018 : Erkki Melartin : Œuvres pour piano, vol. 2 (Syrius 141455)

2019 : Väinö Raitio: Œuvres pour piano (Syrius 141491)

2019 : Oskar Merikanto : Pièces pour piano (Syrius 141496)

2019 : Berceuses : Brahms, Chopin, Schumann (Syrius 141493)

2019 : Bach, Mendelssohn, Wagner : transcriptions pour piano à quatre mains, avec Jean-Francois Bouvery (Syrius 141490)

2020 : Cloches, pièces pour piano : Vuillemin, Bach, Bizet, Grieg, Moussorgski, Hannikainen, Ravel, Debussy(Syrius 141498)

2020 : Le violon fantasque : Debussy, Ravel, Dubois, de Sarasate, avec Frédéric Pelassy (violon) (BNL 112989)

2020 : Jazzy Keyboard : Nikolaï Kapustin, Oscar Peterson, Art Tatum, Bart Howard (Syrius 141499)

2021 : Piano Recess : Martucci, Mascagni, Glinka, Cosma, Liszt, Gonchigsumlaa, Sharav(Syrius 141501)

2022 : Theodor Kirchner : Œuvres pour piano (Syrius 141473)

2022 : Rhapsodies: Brahms, Liszt, Vianna da Motta, Saint-Saëns (Syrius 141500)

2022 : Brahms, Sonate n°3 ; Edward Elgar, Variations Enigma (Syrius 141502)

2022 : Mozaïek : Guy-Claude Luypaerts, Vogtland Philharmonic Orchestra sous la direction de Guy-Claude Luypaerts : Concerto classique, Gorée (Ars Produktion)

2022 : Violon passion : Bachelet, Manuel de Falla, Dvorak, Elgar, Fauré, Grieg, Sibelius, Wagner, avec Frédéric Pelassy (violon) (BNL 112992)

2023: Film Music : Transcriptions de musiques de films : Miklós Rózsa, Vangelis, John Williams, Nino Rota, Joe Hisaishi, Basil Poledouris... (most transcriptions and arrangements by Jean Dubé) ( Syrius 141497)

2023: Chopin, Les études : Intégrale des études de Chopin ( op.10, op.25, 3 nouvelles études B.130) ( Syrius 141501)

2024: Liszt, 12 Etudes d'éxécution transcendante, 2 études de concert (Syrius,141510 )

2024/2025: Sonates violon/piano de Thédore Dubois et Darius Milhaud :avec le violoniste Amara Tir ( Continuo Classics, CC 777.840)

2024: Mélodies de Louis Diémer et de Marcel Dupré : Solstice avec la soprano Camille Chapron ( SOCD410)

2025: Film Music II : Transcriptions de musiques de films et de séries : Elmer Bernstein, Danny Elfman, Sergei Prokofiev,James Horner, Yann Tiersen, Yuki Kajiura... (Syrius 141513)

2025: Impromptus et Intermezzos: Schubert, Brahms, Chopin, Liszt, Ernst Mielck, Sibelius, Manuel Ponce, Mel Bonis, Cécile Chaminade, Poulenc, Jón Leifs, Isidore Philipp ( Syrius 141512)

2026: Saint-Saëns: Œuvres et arrangements pour piano (reference not yet disclosed, due to be released soon under Syrius label)

== Videography ==
- November 1999: Grieg Concerto for piano in A minor and Saint-Saëns Concerto n°4 for piano filmed for TF1, France 3 and Muzzik (French Cable TV) on French Television in the Cathedral of Saint John the Baptist of Lyon, Orchestre Le Sinfonia de Lyon conducted by Jean-Claude Guérinot
- September 2004: Beethoven Concerto n°5 aka "Emperor Concerto", filmed at l'Arsenal in Metz for TF1, France 3 & cable TV, Orchestre National de Lorraine conducted by Jacques Mercier
- September 2005: Rachmaninov Concerto n°3, filmed at the Arsenal Concert Hall in Metz for TF1, France 3 & cable TV, Orchestre National de Lorraine conducted by Jacques Mercier
- October 2006: Ravel Concerto en si and Rachmaninov Rhapsody on a Theme of Paganini, filmed for TF1, France 3 & cable TV, Eglise Notre-Dame, La Rochelle, Orchestre des Coréades conducted by Jean-Yves Gaudin
- September 2008, 4th & 6th: Live recording for TF1 of a Bach concerto and Ravel's Concerto for the Left Hand, Royal Monastery of Brou, Bourg-en-Bresse, Ensemble Vocal et Instrumental de l'Ain conducted by Eric Reynaud.
- 2009: Participation in Ophra Yerushalmi's documentary film Liszt's Dance with the Devil.

== See also ==
- International Franz Liszt Piano Competition

== General references ==
- Dent, Huntley (1 September 2014). "PARAPHRASES RUSSES". Fanfare. 38 (1): 488–489.
- Becker (2005). "Liszt: Ballades; Polonaises; Au Bord D'une Source; 3 Morceaux Suisses". American Record Guide. 68 (4): 139.
- Bayley, Lynn René (2012). "Choral Dorien. Préludes Profane". Fanfare. 35 (6): 176.
- Rucker, P. (2011). "LISZT: Wagner Transcriptions. WEBER-LISZT Oberon: Overture". Fanfare. 35 (1): 337–338.
