= Teresa Margaret of the Sacred Heart =

Italian Discalced Carmelite nun, mystic and saint

Saint Teresa Margaret of the Sacred Heart, OCD
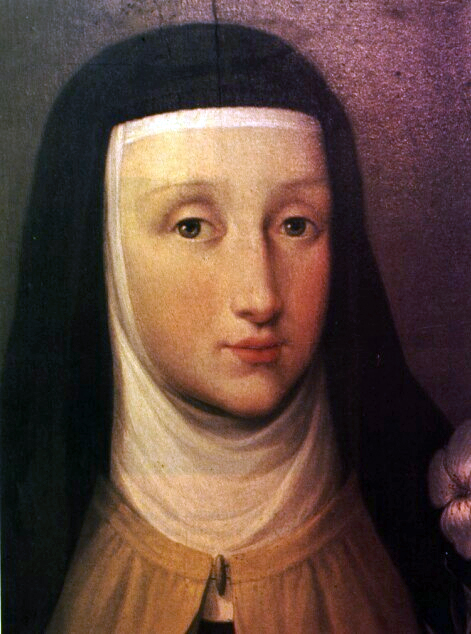
- Portrait by Anna Piattoli (1770)

Virgin
- Born: 15 July 1747; Arezzo
- Died: 7 March 1770 (aged 22); Florence
- Venerated in: Catholic Church (Discalced Carmelite Order)
- Beatified: 9 June 1929 by Pope Pius XI
- Canonized: 19 March 1934 by Pope Pius XI
- Major shrine: Monastery of the Discalced Carmelite nuns, Florence
- Feast: 1 September

Teresa Margaret of the Sacred Heart, OCD (born Anna Maria Redi; 15 July 1747 – 7 March 1770) was an Italian Discalced Carmelite nun. During her brief life of quiet service in the monastery, she came to be revered for her mystical gifts. She was canonized by Pope Pius XI in 1934.

== Life ==
She was born Anna Maria Redi to a large noble family in Arezzo, the second child of Count Ignazio Maria Redi and Camilla Billeti. At the age of 9, she was enrolled in the boarding school of the Benedictine monks of the Monastery of St. Apollonia in Florence. When she was older, Redi began to ponder her future. A chance happening set her on the course of her life. An alumna of the monastery school had returned to bid farewell to her former teachers, as she was entering the community of Discalced Carmelite nuns in the city. Redi was deeply moved by the enthusiasm and joy she saw in the older girl's face. As she reflected on this, she felt that she suddenly received an unspoken message from the foundress of the Order, the noted Carmelite mystic and foundress, Teresa of Avila.

By April 1764, Redi had completed her studies and her father brought her home. Once there she decided to test herself to see if she could in fact handle the rigors of the life of that Order. Eventually following that call, on 1 September 1764, she formally submitted her request for admission to the assembled Discalced Carmelite nuns of the Monastery of St. Teresa in Florence. In keeping with the custom of the time, she then left the monastery for two months and stayed with a friend of the family in the city, while awaiting a formal reply to her petition.

Redi was admitted to the monastery in November 1764. On 11 March of the following year, she was given the religious habit of the Order and the religious name of Teresa Margaret Marianne of the Sacred Heart. She professed her religious vows as a member of the Order on 12 March 1766.

Teresa Margaret was a very private and spiritual person. She was assigned to the office of infirmarian (nurse) for the community and was talented at reaching the deaf and mentally ill nuns among her charges. During this, she was able to grow deeply in her interior life. She experienced a special contemplative experience concerning the words of I John 4:8, "God is love", which was a phrase she would repeat often. She experienced constant reprimands and humiliations by the prioress of the community, but she proved to be unfailingly cheerful.

At the start of 1770, an epidemic broke out in the monastic community. Teresa Margaret worked ceaselessly caring for the other nuns. In early March she seemed to have a premonition of her sudden death, which was at the young age of 23. On 6 March, having been forced to miss the community meal, she was eating alone in the refectory when she had a sudden attack of a pain similar to colic which left her unable to reach her room until morning. Eventually taking to her bed, she summoned help. Although she was suffering a good deal of pain, she refused to be cared for by the other nuns, so as not to burden them. Given the Last Rites that afternoon, she then lost her ability to speak or move. Death soon followed.

== Veneration ==
The disease that had caused Teresa Margaret's death left her body very swollen and disfigured. Consequently, the nuns hesitated to have the normal viewing for the public. While the body was being transferred to their church, the disfigurement was found to have been reversed, and two days after her death her body was lifelike. Seeing this, the Prior Provincial of the Discalced Carmelite friars permitted a postponement of her funeral for another 15 days. During this time, the Archbishop of Florence, several priests and doctors, as well as the populace of the city, came and saw the state of her body. Many later testified to the fact that the body was as lifelike as though she were sleeping, and there was not the least visible evidence of decay.

In 1806, the prioress and nuns of St. Teresa in Florence promoted the beatification of the mystic nun by publishing a biography. The process was finally approved in 1929 and her canonization followed suit in 1934. Teresa Margaret is one of seven Discalced Carmelite nuns to have been declared saints. The other six are: Saints Teresa of Avila, Teresa Benedicta of the Cross, Teresa of Los Andes, Elizabeth of the Trinity, Thérèse of Lisieux, and Mariam Baouardy.

Her incorrupt body lies in the church of the Discalced Carmelite monastery in Florence.

== See also ==
- Carmelite Rule of St. Albert
- Book of the First Monks
- Constitutions of the Carmelite Order

== Bibliography ==
Hervé Roullet, Sainte Thérèse-Marguerite Redi, Une spiritualité du Coeur de Jésus, Coll. « Saints du monde », Éd. Pierre Téqui, Paris, 2017 (fr)
