= Oblates of the Holy Spirit =

The Oblates of the Holy Spirit (Italian: Suore Oblate dello Spirito Santo; Latin: Institutum Oblatarum Spiritus Sancti; abbreviation: O.S.S.) is a religious institute of pontifical right whose members profess public vows of chastity, poverty, and obedience and follow the evangelical way of life in common. Their mission includes education of youth, catechetical and pastoral activities.

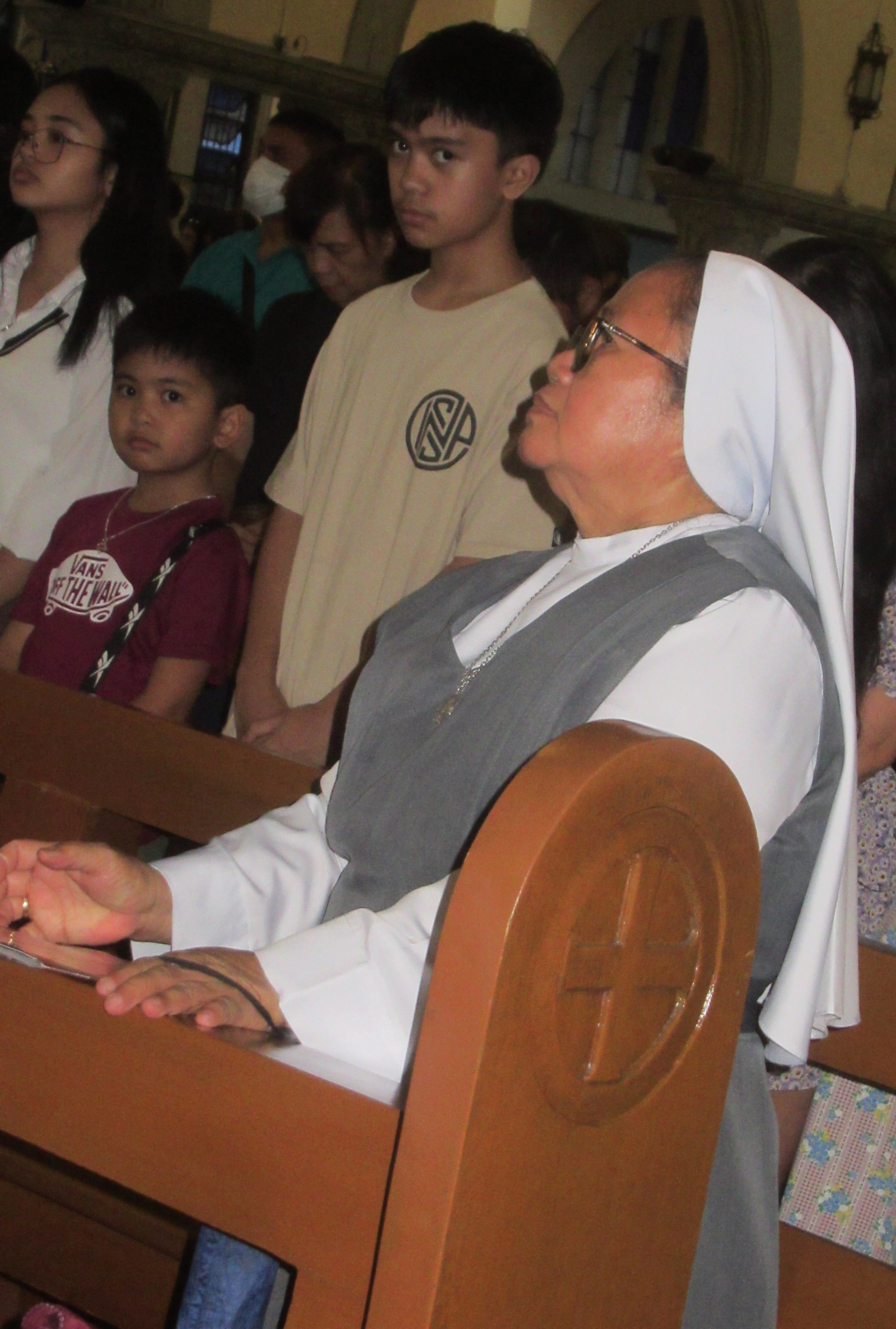
Sisters Oblates of the Holy Spirit (Philippines)

The Oblates of the Holy Spirit was founded in Lucca, Italy, in 1882, by Bl. Elena Guerra.

The sisters now have houses in Cameroon, Canada, Italy, Philippines, and Rwanda.

The Generalate of the Congregation is located in Rome, Italy. As of 31 December 2008, there were 232 sisters in 36 communities.

Pope Pius X issued a pontifical decree of coronation on 9 September 1904 granted to Mother Superior Elena Guerra to impose a diadem of stars towards their venerated image of the Blessed Virgin of the Immaculate Conception for the 50th Anniversary of the Marian Jubilee of 1904, enshrined in their monastery. This decree was signed and executed by Cardinal Casimiro Gennari, and notarized by the Secretary of the Sacred Congregation of Rites, Monsigneur Archbishop Diomede Panici.
