= Royal Monastery of Brou =

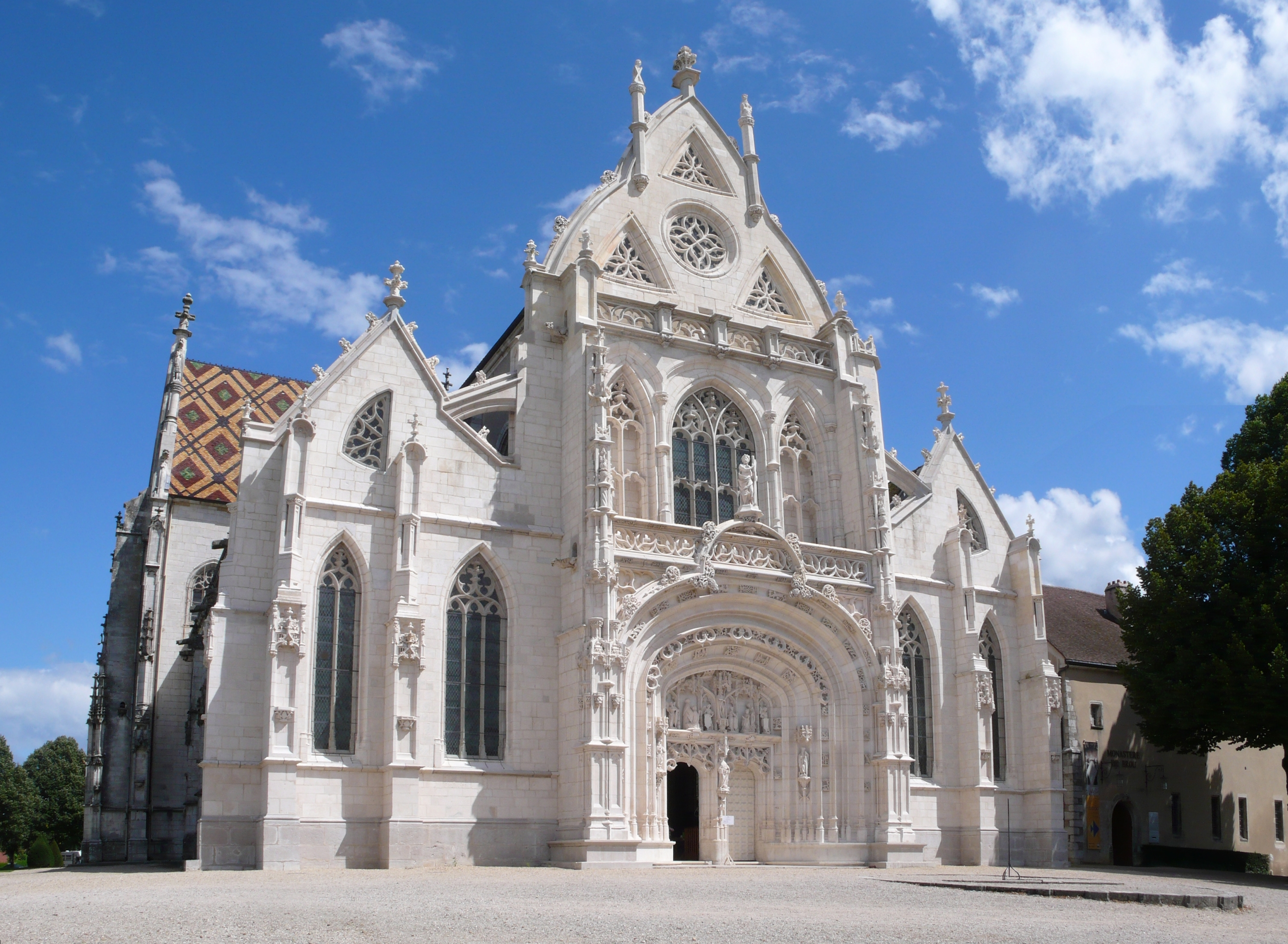
- Façade of the church, Royal Monastery of Brou
- Interactive map of Royal Monastery of Brou
- Location: Bourg-en-Bresse, Ain, Auvergne-Rhône-Alpes, France
- Coordinates: 46.1976°N 5.2363°E
- Width: 30 m (98 ft)
- Height: 72 m (236 ft)
- Beginning date: 1506
- Completion date: 1532
- Website: http://www.monastere-de-brou.fr/

The Royal Monastery of Brou is a religious complex located at Bourg-en-Bresse in the Ain département, central France. Made out of monastic buildings in addition to a church, they were built at the beginning of the 16th century by Margaret of Austria, daughter of the Holy Roman Emperor Maximilian I and Governor of the Habsburg Netherlands. The complex was designed as a dynastic burial place in the tradition of the Burgundian Champmol and Cîteaux Abbey, and the French Saint-Denis. The church is known as the Église Saint-Nicolas-de-Tolentin de Brou in French.

The church was built between 1506 and 1532 in a lavishly elaborate Flamboyant Gothic style, with some classicizing Renaissance aspects. The tall roof is covered in coloured, glazed tiles. Margaret, her second husband Philibert II, Duke of Savoy, and his mother, Margaret of Bourbon, are all buried in tombs by Conrad Meit within the church, which have avoided the destruction that most royal tombs in France have suffered.

The monastery is the property of the town of Bourg-in-Bresse, which installed the municipal art collection in the buildings in 1922. The museum presents religious statues of the 13th to 17th centuries on the ground floor, and a collection of paintings of the 16th to the 20th centuries on the upper floor.

The church and monastery have been classed as a monument historique since 1862. The buildings are in the care of the French state, and are managed by the Centre des monuments nationaux.

== Meit's tomb group ==
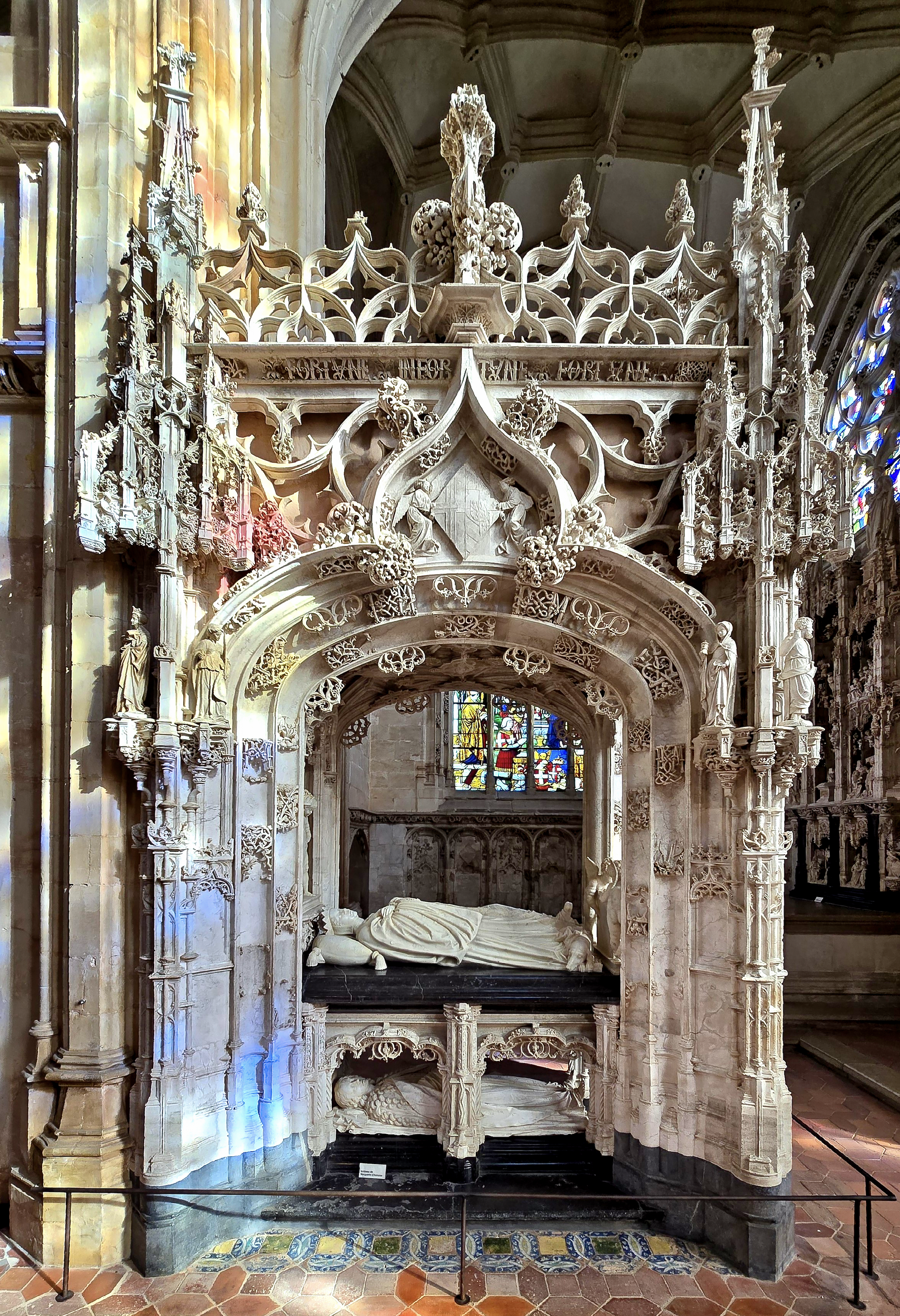
Margaret of Austria's Tomb

Conrad Meit's career led him from his birthplace at Worms on the Rhine, to the Wittenberg court and finally to Cranach's workshop in Mechelen. There he is recorded as court sculptor for Archduchess Margaret of Austria, Regent of the Netherlands from 1512 to 1530. For her Meits completed his most famous masterpieces, the group of monumental royal tombs for Margaret, her husband Philibert II, Duke of Savoy and his mother Margaret of Bourbon, produced from 1526 onwards. These are at the then newly built Royal Monastery of Brou, today in France, but then in the province of Bresse, part of the Duchy of Savoy.

Philibert had died at the age of 24 in 1504, so Meit's images of him are based on other portraits. His majestic grave monument is placed in the middle of the Abbey's choir, with the two female tombs set against the wall on either side of it. The three aligned figures are turned towards each other, as though in communication. Though to the side, Margaret's tomb is the largest. Philibert's tomb consists of two levels and two effigies, one above the other. The upper part, in expensive imported white Carrara marble, represents the Duke in ceremonial costume, surrounded by Italian-style angels (putti). Below this, ten little female figures, the sibyls point towards the effigy. To the north, the tomb of Margaret of Bourbon consists of a single effigy placed within an enfeu and lying upon a piece of black marble, with pleurants beneath, a traditional Burgundian feature. The princess is dressed in an ermine cloak and her feet rest on a greyhound, symbol of loyalty. Behind the effigy, putti bear escutcheons with the initials of Margaret and her husband.

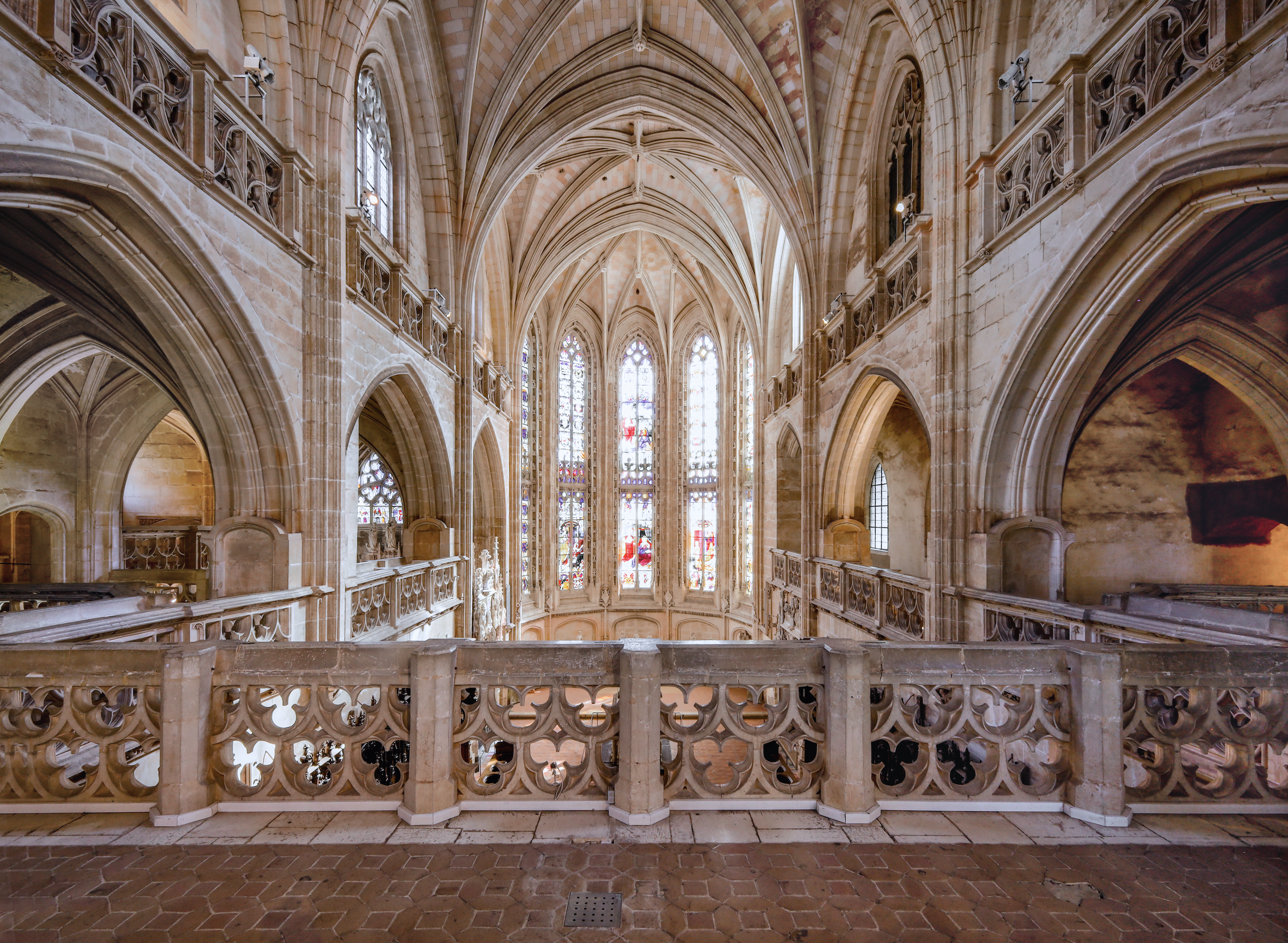
View into the choir from the balcony.

Margaret of Austria's tomb also has an upper effigy in marble and a lower one in alabaster. In the upper one she is shown as an older woman in dress of state, wearing the crown-like archducal hat. Below she is shown in her youth, wearing a loose robe with her long hair unbound, and somewhat idealized. The two lower figures of the married couple vary the normal "transi" or cadaver tomb iconography, where a lower figure is shown as decayed remains, and connects to a broader theme of Resurrection in the abbey's art. Below their formal effigies, the couple are shown in their most perfect state, as they would be at the resurrection of the dead.
