= Francesco Nagni =

Italian sculptor (1897–1977)

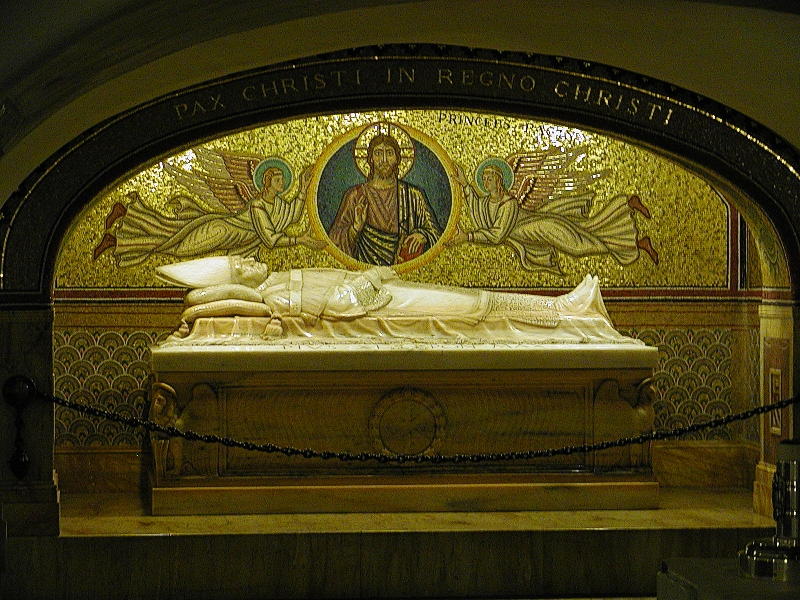
The tomb of Pope Pius XI in the Vatican

Francesco Nagni (7 February 1897–11 July 1977) was a 20th-century Italian figurative sculptor, best known for the grave of Pope Pius XI in the Vatican.

== Life ==
He was born in Viterbo on 7 February 1897.

He spent almost his entire life in Rome first studying at the Academy of Saint Luca. After the First World War, working as an assistant in the Academy of Fine Arts in Rome he worked on several state works under the fascist regime of Mussolini. These included the monument to Armando Diaz in Naples and many war memorials to Italians killed in the war.

He was involved in the artists group at Villa Strohl Fern in Rome. From around 1940 he started to receive commissions from the Vatican and his work is now represented in St Peter's Basilica, His work would have requited multiple meets with both the Pope and other senior church officials. His works are not only on the public side within the church but notably includes the tomb of Pope Pius XI in the crypts.

He died in Rome on 11 July 1977 aged 80.

Around 2000 Nagni's family donated 34 plaster casts by Nagni to the Museum of Viterbo most of which stand in the Sacred Art section. These are the moulds from which his various bronze works were cast.

== Recognition ==
In Viterbo, his birthplace the municipality has named a street near the railway station after Nagni: Via Francesco Nagni.

== Known works ==
- Tomb of Pope Pius XI (1940), Vatican City, Rome
- Ostiense Railway Station frontage, Rome (1940) Pegasus with a God
- Armando Diaz monument, Naples (c.1935)
- Huge figure of St Paul at the Church of St Peter and St Paul, Rome (EUR quarter) (1959)
- Manzi grave in St. Pancras and Islington Cemetery, London (1962), two bronze angels lowering a female figure into the grave
- Seated figure of Pope Pius XI at Museo de Colle del Duomo in Viterbo (1964)
- Seated figure of Pope Pius XI at Castel Gandolfo (1964)
- Seated figure of Pope Pius XI, St. Peter's Basilica, Rome (1965) replacing a previous statue by Pietro Canonica
- Tomb of St Gemma, Sanctuary of St Gemma, Lucca (1965)
- Gilded bronze urn containing the body of Saint Pius X Sarto (1952) St Peters Basilica, Rome
- Statues of St Alphonsus, Francis de Sales and Hilary of Poitiers at Sao Paulo Cathedral in Brazil
- St Lucy holding a lamp, Church of St Lucy, Rome
- Assumption Virgin and six bronze angels on the tomb of Don Luigi Sturzo, in Caltagirone, Catania, Sicily

== Unbuilt commissions ==
Commission from Pope Pius XII for new bronze doors on St Peters, which were to be known as the Faith Door and the Splendour Door, involving work from 1947 to 1970 (now in the Vatican Museum). These doors were to consist of multiple bronze bas-relief panels featuring various Christian stories, such as Nero Persecuting the Christians.
