= Dante and Virgil in the Ninth Circle of Hell =

1861 painting by Gustave Doré

- Dante et Virgile dans le neuvième cercle de l’enfer (French)
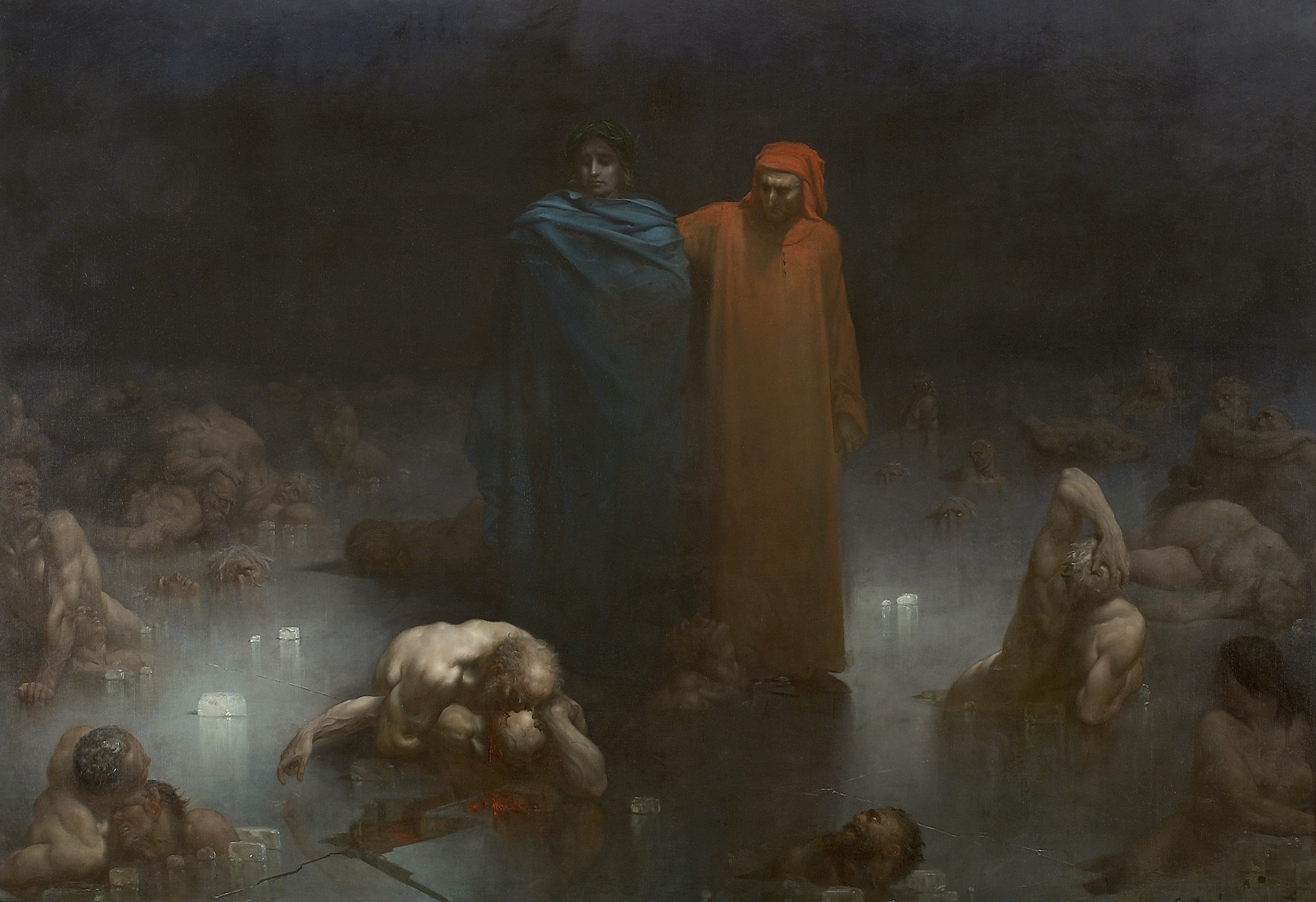
- Artist: Gustave Doré
- Year: c. 1861
- Medium: Oil on canvas
- Dimensions: 315 cm × 450 cm (124 in × 180 in)
- Location: Municipal Museum of Bourg-en-Bresse; Bourg-en-Bresse

Dante and Virgil in the Ninth Circle of Hell (French: Dante et Virgile dans le neuvième cercle de l’enfer) is an oil painting on canvas completed in 1861 by the French artist Gustave Doré. The work is based on a scene from Dante Alighieri's Inferno, specifically the ninth and final circle of Hell, reserved for traitors.

It was first exhibited in Paris at the Salon of 1861.
