= Hôtel de Ville, Bourg-en-Bresse =

Town hall in Bourg-en-Bresse, France

Hôtel de Ville
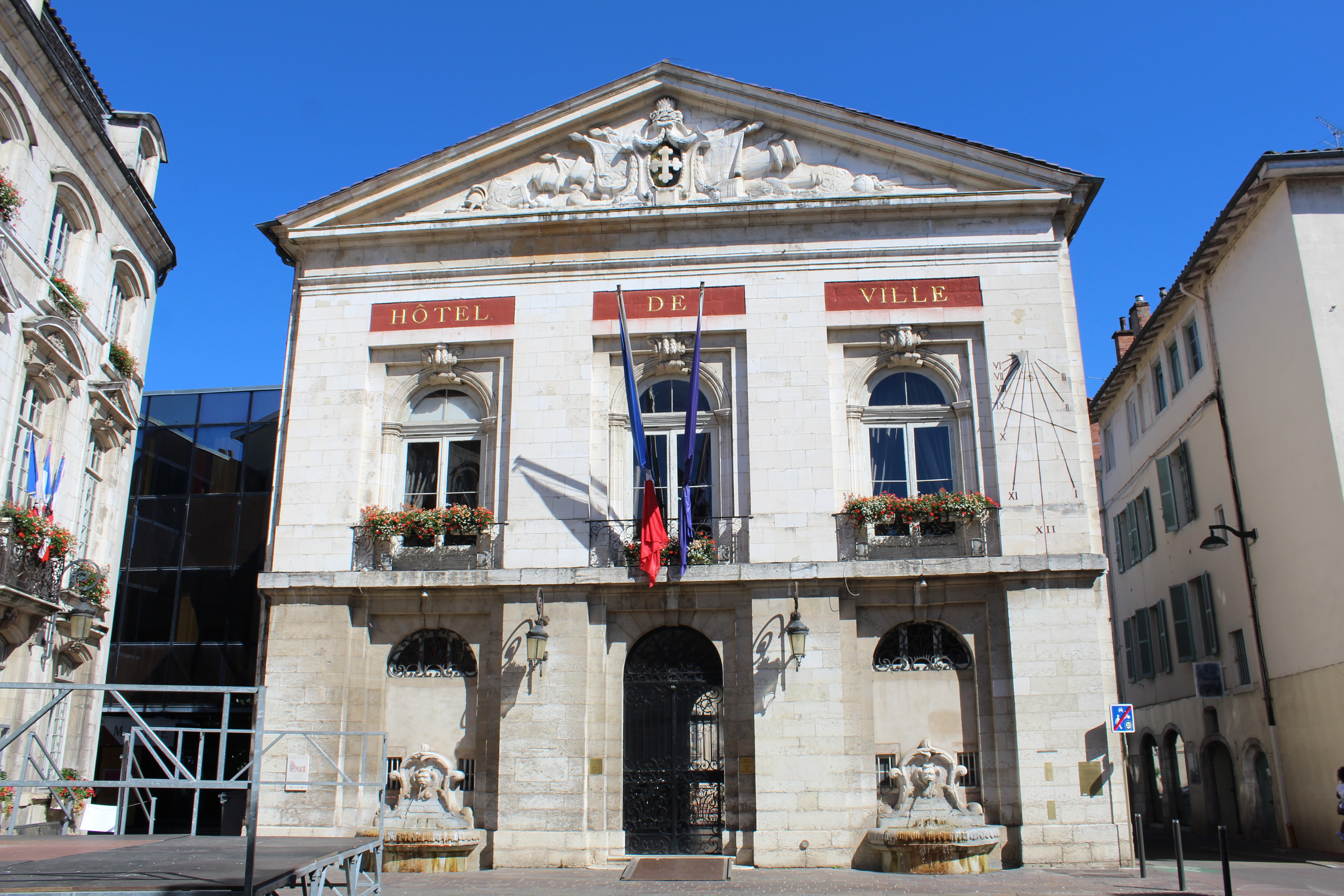
- The main frontage of the Hôtel de Ville in July 2016

General information
- Type: City hall
- Architectural style: Neoclassical style
- Location: Bourg-en-Bresse, France
- Coordinates: 46.2052°N 5.2253°E
- Completed: 1771

Monument historique
- Official name: Hôtel de ville
- Type: Inscrit
- Designated: 1932
- Reference no.: PA00116324

The Hôtel de Ville (French pronunciation: [otɛl də vil], City Hall) is a municipal building in Bourg-en-Bresse, Ain, in eastern France, standing on Place de l'Hôtel de Ville. It was designated a monument historique by the French government in 1932.

== History ==
In the Middle Ages, civic leaders met either in the open air in the town square, or at the local hospital, or in the refectory of the local convent, or in the cathedral. In the late 16th century, a town hall was established on Rue Notre-Dame. However, by the mid-18th century, the old town hall was dilapidated and civic leaders decided to commission a new building. The site they selected was at the southwest end of Rue Notre-Dame, on the northwest side of what is now Place de l'Hôtel de Ville. Construction works commenced in 1761. The building was designed in the neoclassical style, built in ashlar stone and was completed in 1771.

The design involved a symmetrical main frontage of three bays facing south onto Place de l'Hôtel de Ville. On the ground floor, there were three round headed openings with voussoirs and keystones. On the first floor, there were three French doors with moulded surrounds and iron railings and, at roof level, there was a pediment with the cross of Savoy in the tympanum. Two fountains, commissioned by the intendant of Burgundy, Jean-François Dufour de Villeneuve, were created by the Dijon sculptor, Jean-Marie Fyot, in the early 1760s and installed in front of the outer openings at around the time the building was completed.

Following the liberation of the town on 4 September 1944, during the Second World War, members of the Maquis mixed with local people in front of the town hall to welcome the arrival of American troops in their military vehicles.

By the early 1960s, the town hall was cramped and the council decided to acquire an adjacent building to accommodate the mayor's parlour and other services. The building they selected, the Hôtel de Bohan, on the southwest side of Place de l'Hôtel de Ville, had been designed in the neoclassical style, built in ashlar stone, and completed in 1740. The building was the home to the Bohan family who served as cavalry officers in the French Army. Following the departure of the last resident, François-Philibert Loubat de Bohan, the Hôtel de Bohan became the offices of a publishing company, Journal de l'Ain, in 1800. After the owners, the Villefranche family, were accused of collaborating with the Germans during the Second World War, the building was acquired by René Greusard, publisher of La République Nouvelle. This arrangement continued until 1962, when the Hôtel de Bohan was acquired by the town council. A connecting block, designed in the modern style and constructed in concrete and glass, was subsequently erected in the corner between the two buildings.

A sundial, intended to commemorate the work of the locally born astronomer, Jérôme Lalande, was installed on the right-hand side of the main frontage of the town hall in 1982.
