= Municipal Museum of Bourg-en-Bresse =

Art museum in France

Coordinates: 46.19720°N 5.23616°E

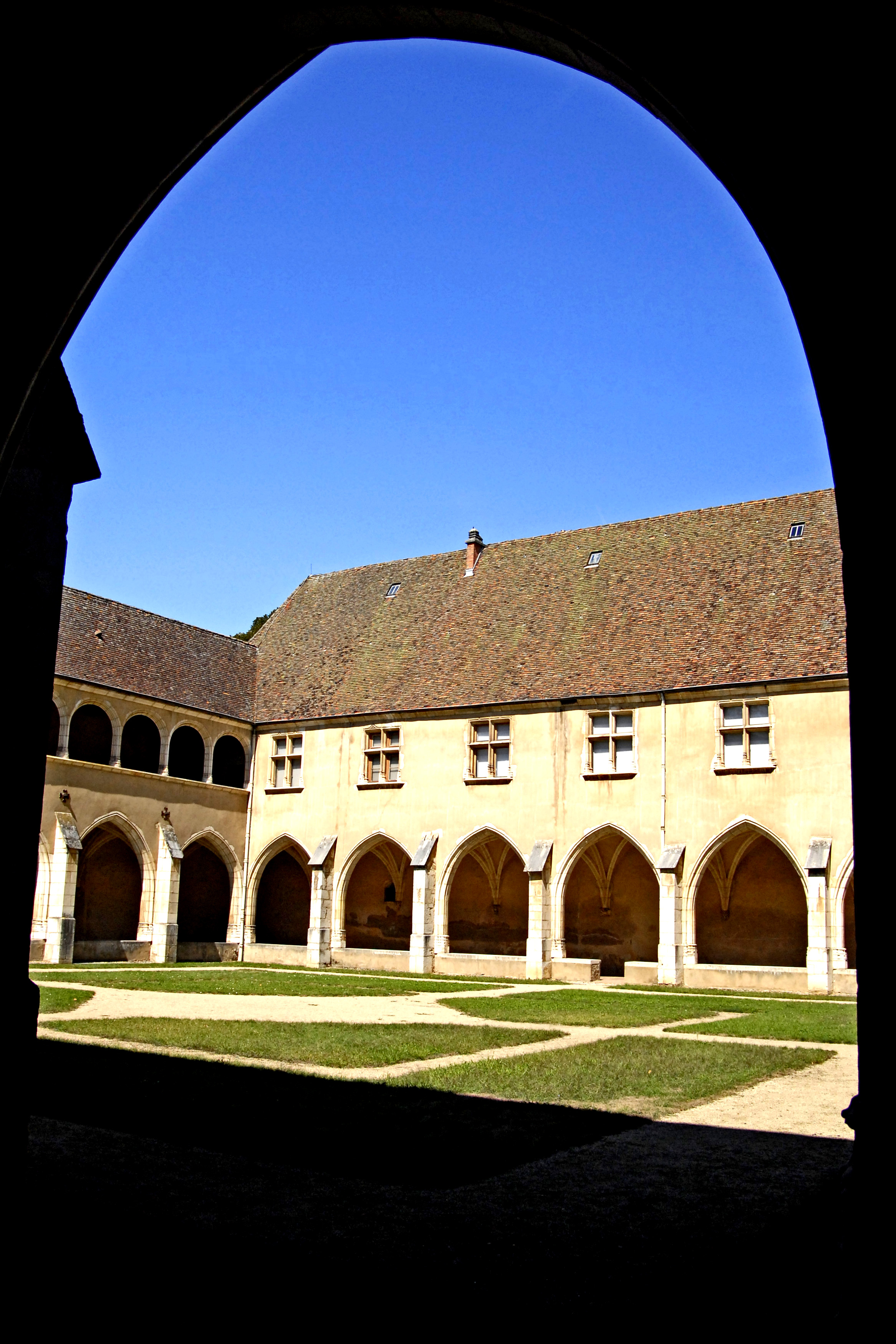
- Location: Monastère royal de Brou (second cloître) 63 boulevard de Brou 01000; Bourg-en-Bresse
- Website: www.monastere-de-brou.fr

The Municipal Museum of Bourg-en-Bresse, sometimes known as the Brou museum, Musée du Monastère Royal de Brou or Beaux-Arts Museum is an art museum located inside the Monastery of Brou in France.

The collections include painting, particularly Flemish and French, from the 15th century to the modern era. Sculpture is also represented, especially ancient religious sculpture.

== Location ==
The museum is located in one of the wings of the second of the three cloisters in the Monastery of Brou, in Bourg-en-Bresse prefecture of the Ain department in the Auvergne-Rhône-Alpes region in Eastern France.

The museum covers 6,000m^{2}.

== History ==
The museum was founded in 1854. The main collection of the museum was originally made up of 120 paintings donated in the middle of the 19th century by Thomas Riboud [FR] (1765–1835), lawyer and deputy of Ain who saved the abbey from destruction and protected it as a national monument.

As of 2022, 434 items were on display.

== Collections ==
=== Flemish and Dutch paintings ===
The collection of Flemish and Dutch paintings includes four paintings by the official painter of the Charles V, Holy Roman Emperor, two of which are the portraits of young Charles V and Margaret of Austria, the founder of the monastery of Brou, as well as 15th and 16th century works by Jan de Beer, Adrien Ysenbrandt, Jan Brueghel the Elder, Frans Snyders, Frans Franken, Pieter Codde, Adam Frans van der Meulen, Adriaen van der Kabel, Gerard Seghers, Bartholomeus Breenbergh, Pieter Neefs the Younger and Melchior d'Hondecoeter.

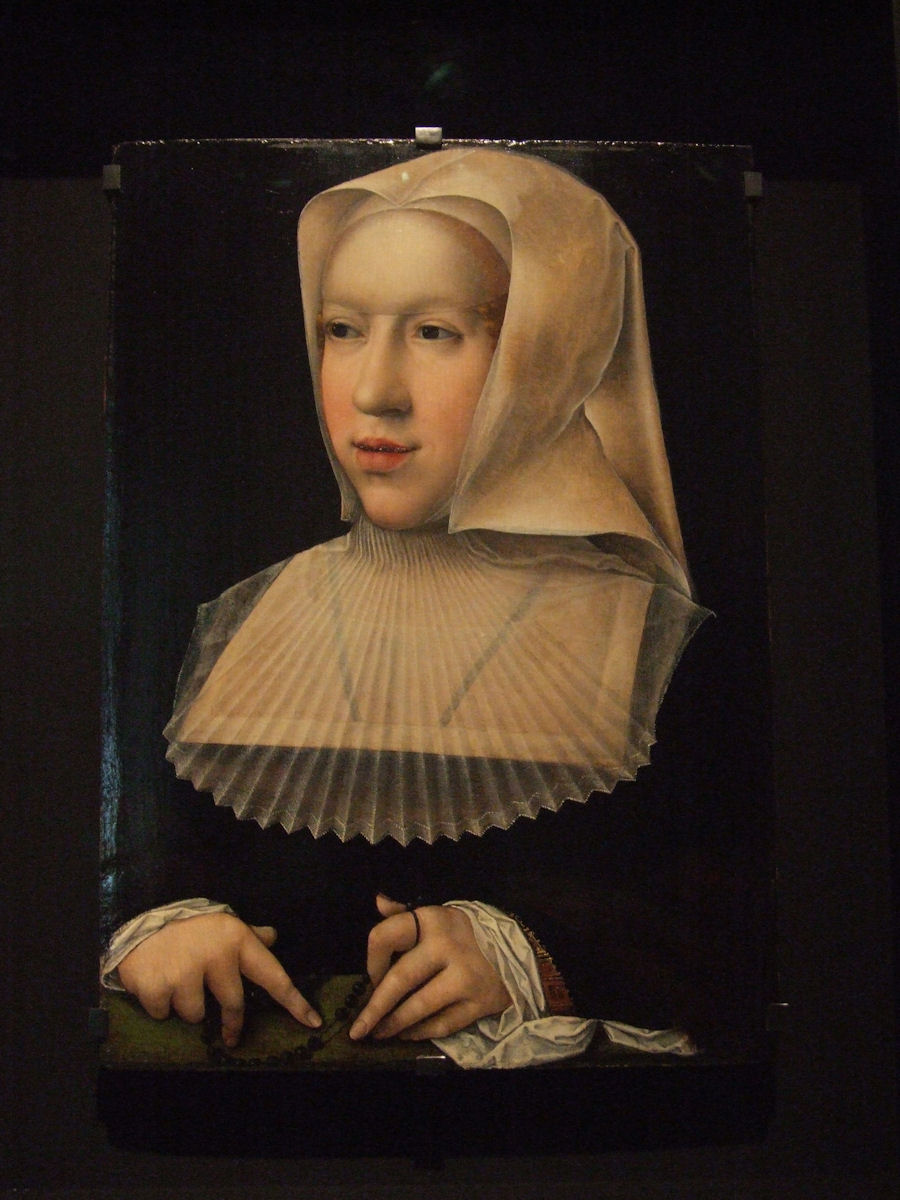
Bernard Van Orley, Marguerite d’Autriche, (1518).

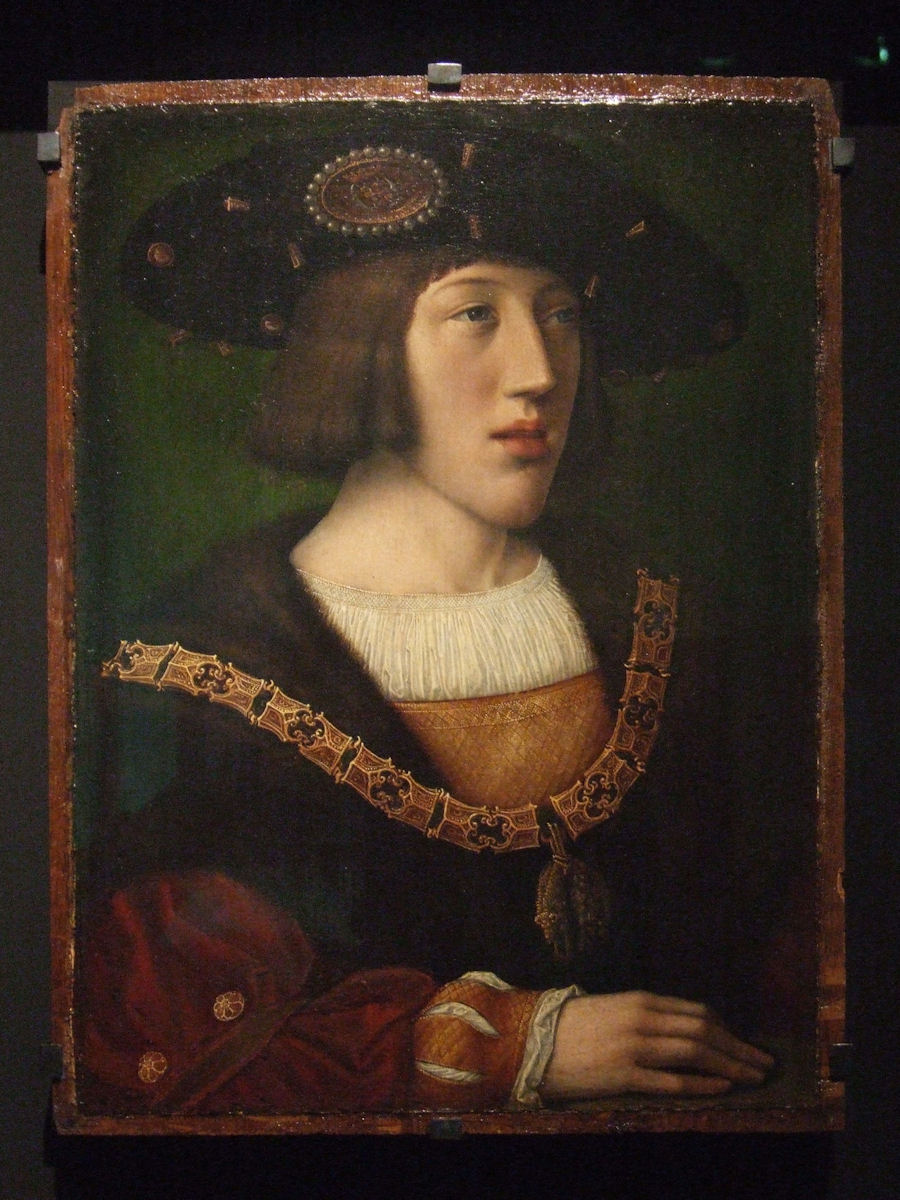
Bernard Van Orley, Charles Quint jeune, (1516).

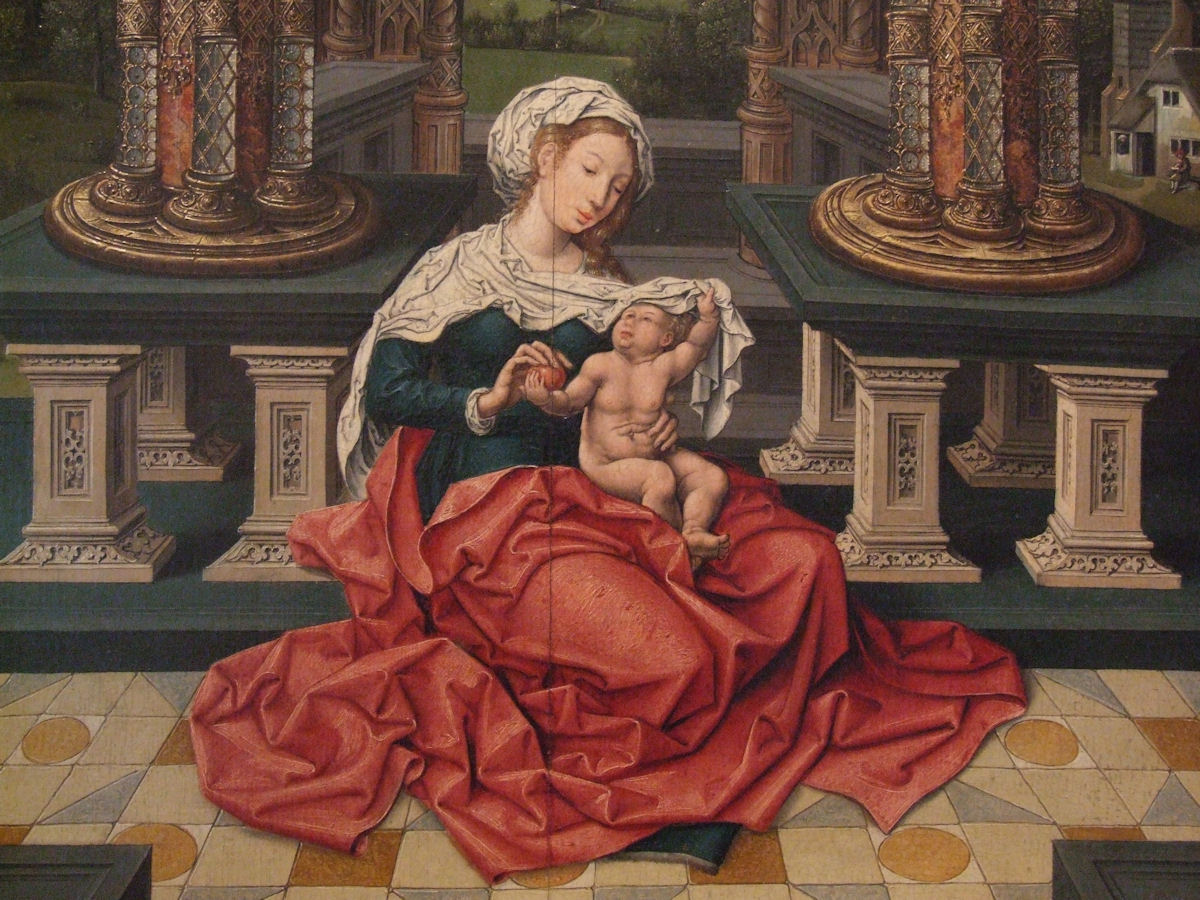
Bernard Van Orley, Vierge à l’Enfant.

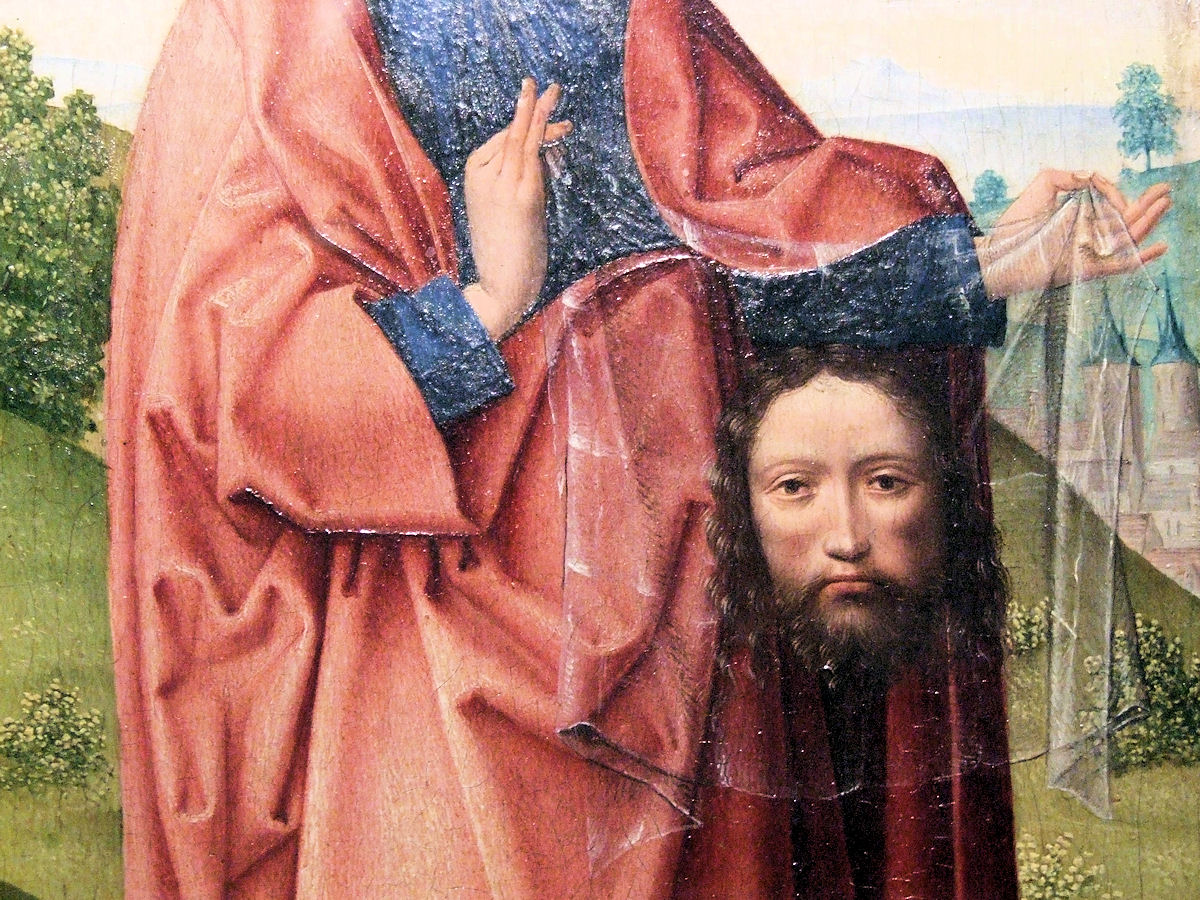
Ecole flamande, brugeoise (15e), détail de Sainte Véronique.

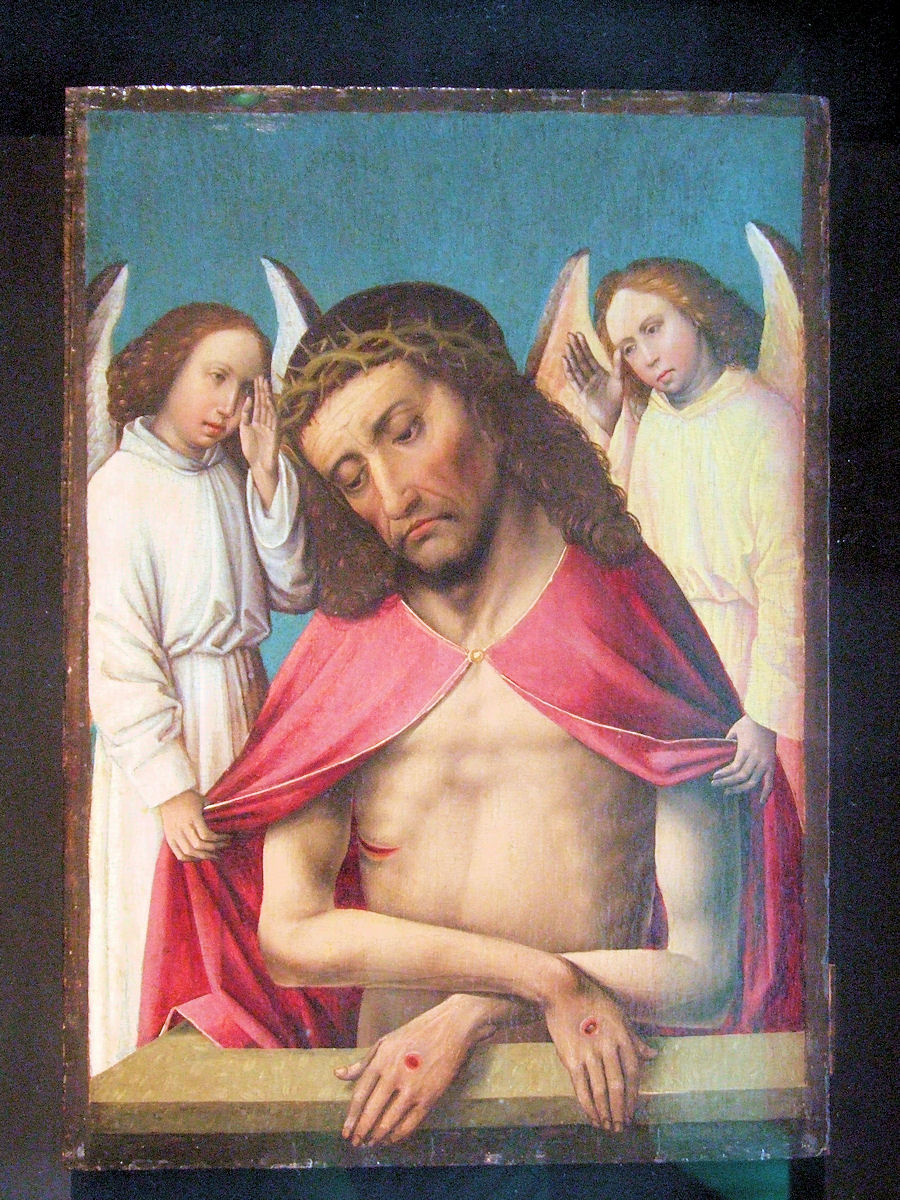
Colijn de Coter, Le Christ de douleur (1480-90).

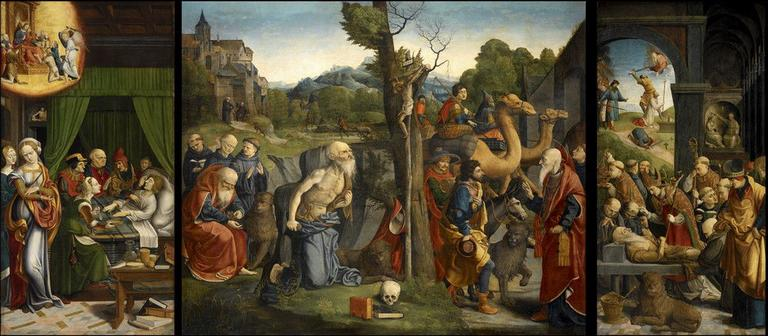
Grégoire Guérard,Triptyque de saint Jérôme, 1518

=== Italian paintings ===
Italian paintings include two paintings by Defendente Ferrari as well as works by and Pietro della Vecchia and Francesco Fontebasso.

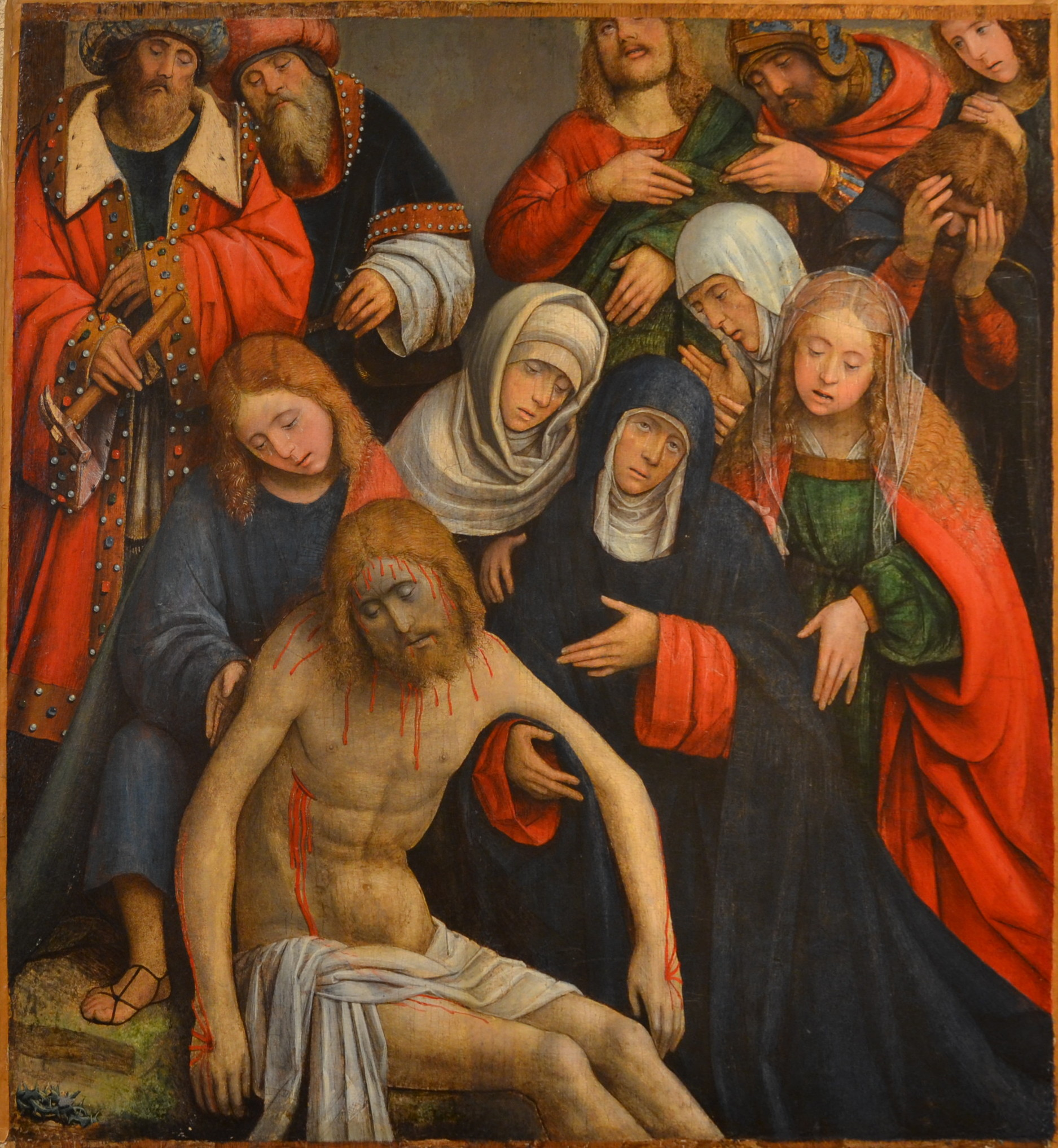
Defendente Ferrari, La déposition de la croix, (1505-1507)

=== French paintings ===
Featured French paintings up to the 18th century include works by Benoît Alhoste and Jacques Bizet's Nature morte aux vieux livres (English: Still life with old books) as well as works by Jean Jouvenet, Nicolas Pierre Loir, René-Antoine Houasse, François de Troy and Nicolas de Largillierre.

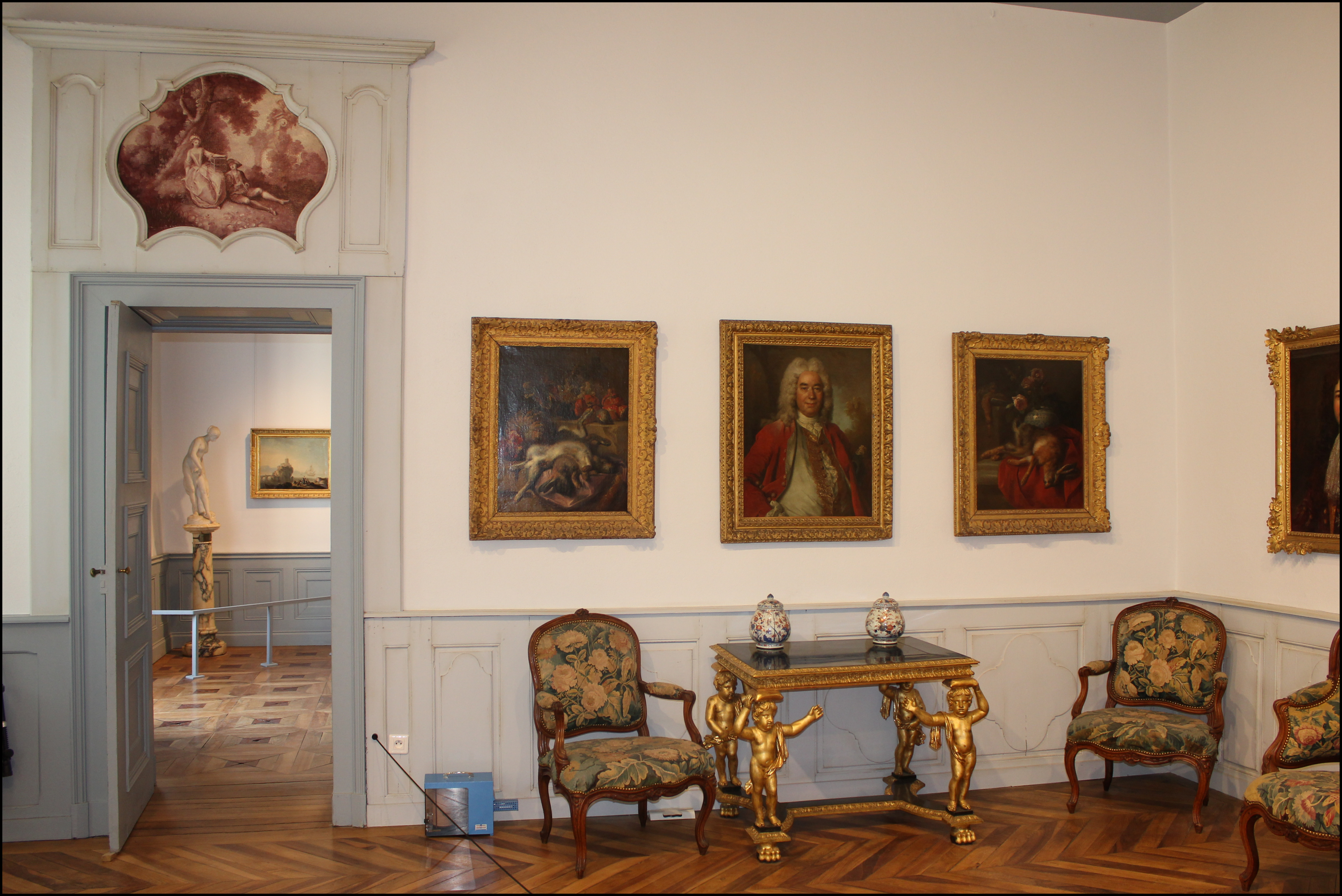
Une des salles du musée consacrée à la peinture.

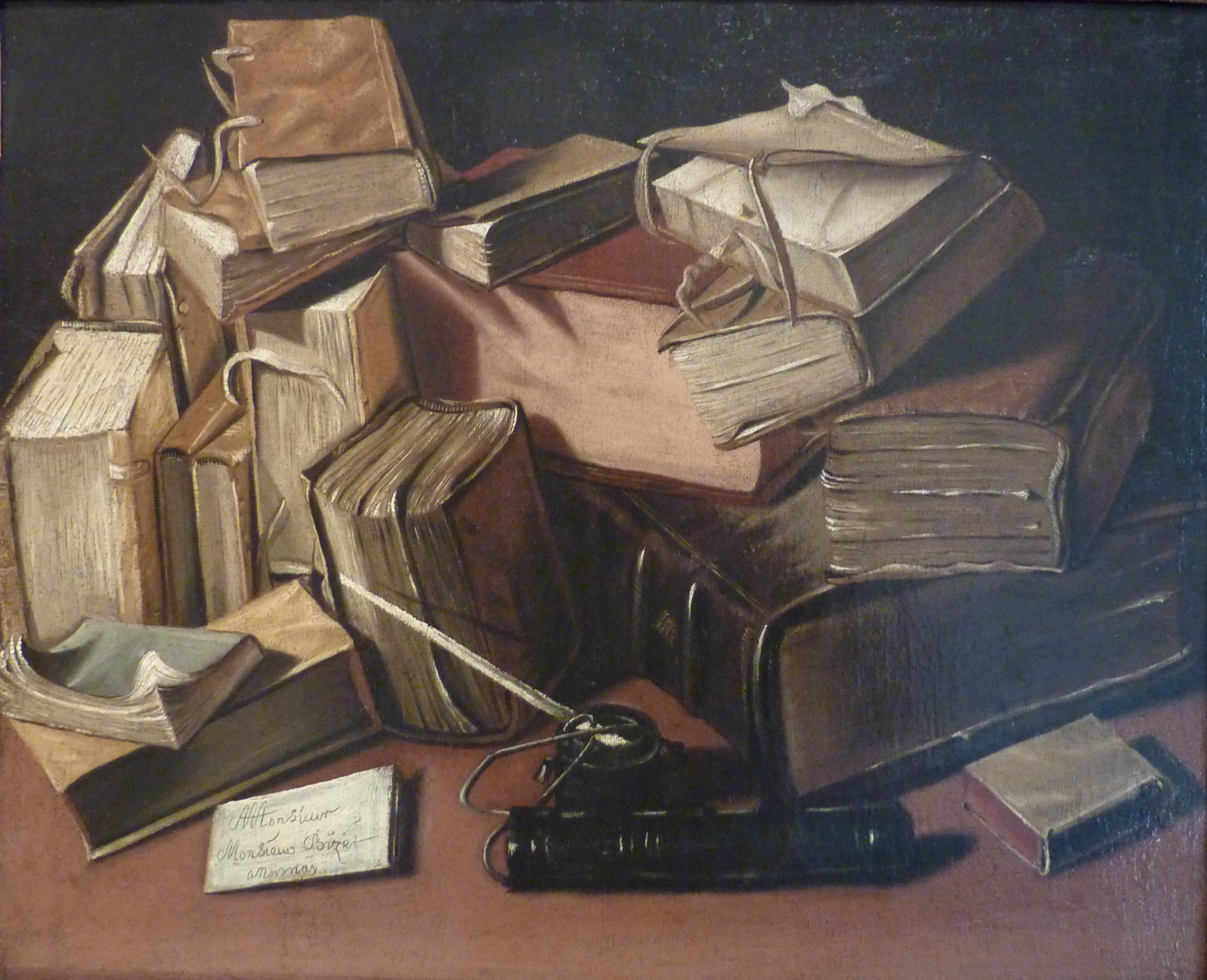
Jacques Bizet, Nature morte aux vieux livres (vers 1650).

19th-century French paintings include paintings in the troubadour style by Fleury François Richard, Pierre Révoil, Gustave Moreau, Gustave Doré (and also one of his sculptures), Jean-François Millet, Elisa Blondel, and Louis Janmot.

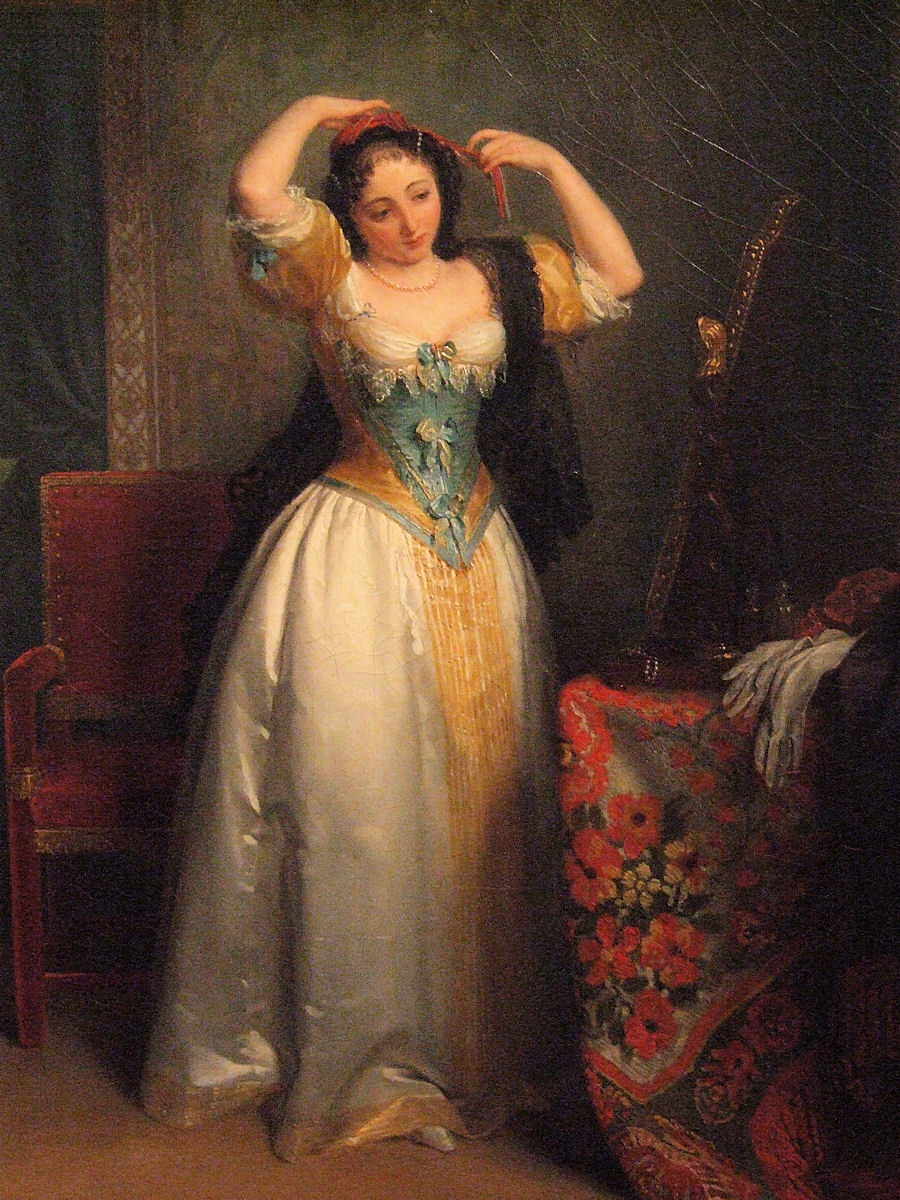
Jean-Augustin Franquelin, Jeune femme devant son miroir, vers 1830.

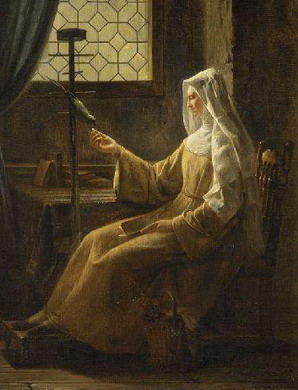
Claudius Jacquand, Vert-Vert, 1835.

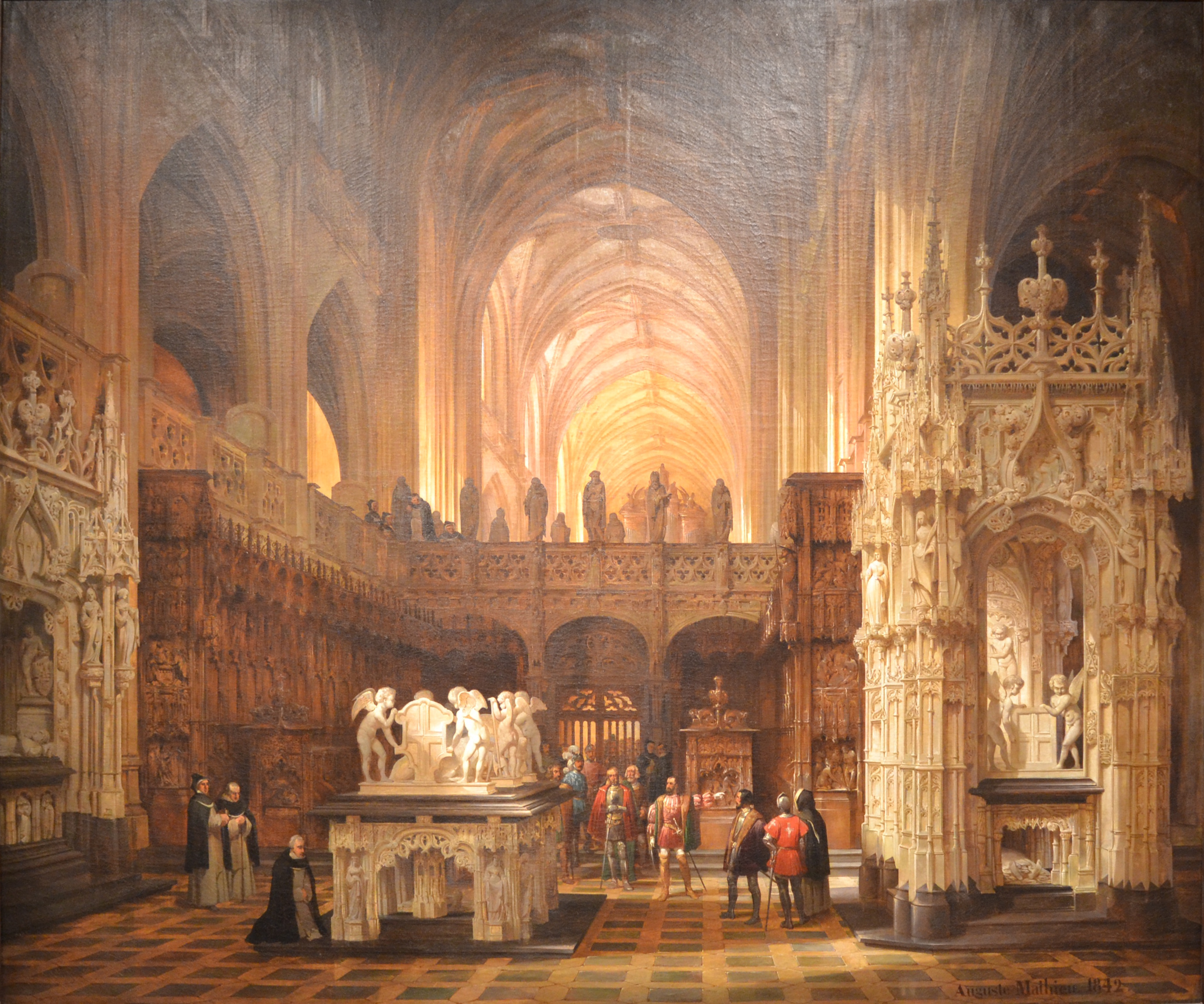
Auguste Mathieu, Visite de François 1er à Brou, 1842.

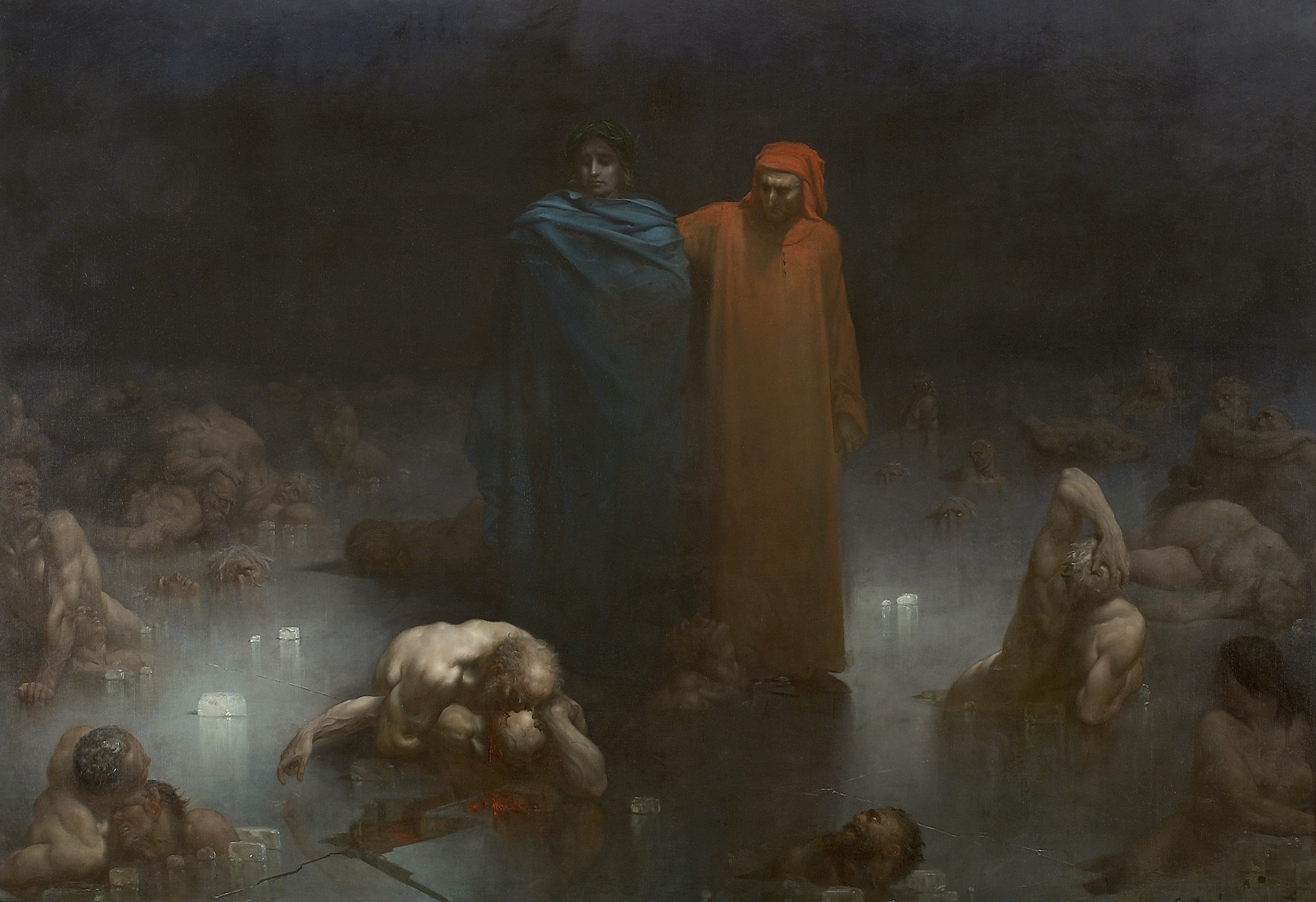
Gustave Doré, Dante et Virgile dans le neuvième cercle de l'enfer, 1861.

French 20th century paintings include works by Jacques-Émile Blanche, Pierre Soulages and Olivier Debré.

=== Other modern paintings ===
Other items that have featured in the museum include paintings by Shahabuddin Ahmed.

=== Other collections ===
The museum's refectory also houses 12th–17th century religious sculptures, as well as furniture and earthenware.

== Exhibitions ==
- 2014 – L’Invention du passé, featuring paintings by Fleury Richard, Pierre Révoil, Henriette Lorimer, François-Marius Granet and Louis Daguerre.
- 2021 – Valadon et ses contemporaines, featuring women painters
