= Canton of Bourg-en-Bresse-1 =

Canton in Auvergne-Rhône-Alpes, France

Coordinates: 46.23°N 5.22°E

- Canton
- Situation of the canton of Bourg-en-Bresse-1 in the department of Ain
- Country: France
- Region: Auvergne-Rhône-Alpes
- Department: Ain
- No. of communes: {{{nbcomm}}}
- Population (2023): 36,084
- INSEE code: 0105

The canton of Bourg-en-Bresse-1 is an administrative division of the Ain department, in eastern France. It was created at the French canton reorganisation which came into effect in March 2015. Its seat is in Bourg-en-Bresse.

It consists of the following communes:

1. Bourg-en-Bresse (partly)
2. Viriat
