= Viriat =

Commune in Auvergne-Rhône-Alpes, France

- Commune
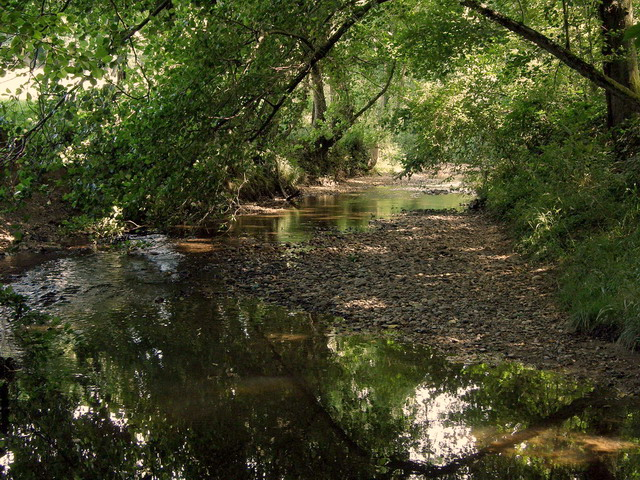
- The Jugnon

- Coat of arms
- Location of Viriat
- Location within France Location within Auvergne-Rhône-Alpes
- Coordinates: 46°15′11″N 5°12′58″E
- Country: France
- Region: Auvergne-Rhône-Alpes
- Department: Ain
- Arrondissement: Bourg-en-Bresse
- Canton: Bourg-en-Bresse-1
- Intercommunality: CA Bassin de Bourg-en-Bresse

Government
  - Mayor (2026–32): Bernard Perret
- Area^{1}: 45.35 km^{2} (17.51 sq mi)
- Elevation: 230 m (750 ft)
- Highest elevation: 257 m (843 ft)
- Lowest elevation: 206 m (676 ft)
- Population (2023): 7,102
  - Density: 156.6/km^{2} (405.6/sq mi)
- Time zone: UTC+01:00 (CET)
  - Summer (DST): UTC+02:00 (CEST)
- INSEE/Postal code: 01451 /01440
- ^{1} French Land Register data, which excludes lakes, ponds, glaciers > 1 km^{2} (0.386 sq mi or 247 acres) and river estuaries.

Viriat (French pronunciation: [viʁja]) is a commune in the Ain department of eastern France.

== History ==
Settlement there goes back to at least the Celtic period.

In the twelfth century, the name "Viriacus" appears in a record, referring to church and a priory.

== Population ==
Historical population

Year	Pop.	±% p.a.
1793	2,122	—
1800	2,119	−0.02%
1806	2,199	+0.62%
1821	2,309	+0.33%
1831	2,394	+0.36%
1836	2,476	+0.68%
1841	2,535	+0.47%
1846	2,530	−0.04%
1851	2,587	+0.45%
1856	2,580	−0.05%
1861	2,578	−0.02%
1866	2,545	−0.26%
1872	2,629	+0.54%
1876	2,690	+0.58%
1881	2,708	+0.13%
1886	2,870	+1.17%
1891	2,741	−0.92%
1896	2,704	−0.27%
1901	2,580	−0.93%

Year	Pop.	±% p.a.
1906	2,574	−0.05%
1911	2,529	−0.35%
1921	2,517	−0.05%
1926	2,578	+0.48%
1931	2,570	−0.06%
1936	2,579	+0.07%
1946	2,678	+0.38%
1954	2,660	−0.08%
1962	2,644	−0.08%
1968	3,012	+2.20%
1975	3,562	+2.42%
1982	3,997	+1.66%
1990	4,701	+2.05%
1999	5,288	+1.32%
2007	5,719	+0.98%
2012	6,160	+1.50%
2017	6,418	+0.82%
2023	7,102	+1.70%

Source: EHESS and INSEE (1968-2023)

== Twin towns ==
Viriat is twinned with:

- Voinești, Vaslui, Romania, since 1989
- Sorbolo, Italy, since 2000

== See also ==
- Communes of the Ain department
