= Benoît Alhoste =

French painter

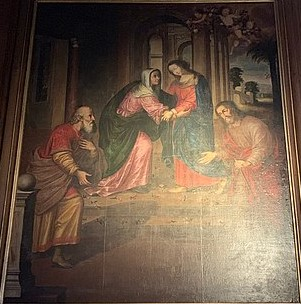
The Visitation by Benoît Alhoste, 1662, inside the Bourg-en-Bresse Cathedral

Benoît Alhoste was a French painter of the 17th century. Likely born in Marsonnas around 1620, he died in Bourg-en-Bresse in 1677. The musée de Brou in Bourg-en-Bresse contains four of his paintings, taken from that city's Convent of the Visitation.
