= Anne Bricollet =

French artist

Anne Bricollet was a French painter and pastellist active between 1786 and 1797.

Bricollet is known only from two works. The earliest is a Pietà in oil, signed and dated 1785 and located in Bourg-en-Bresse Cathedral. The other is a pastel portrait of Marie-Claude-Clémence Martin, later the wife of deputy Louis Sirand; this piece is signed on the back as being by "Mlle Bricollet", and described as having been finished on April 23, 1797. Nothing further is recorded of Bricollet, but a woman named Anne-Henriette Bricollet is known to have died in Bourg-en-Bresse in 1833.
