= Bourg-en-Bresse Cathedral =

Cathedral in Bourg-en-Bresse, France

Coordinates: 46°12′21″N 5°13′39″E

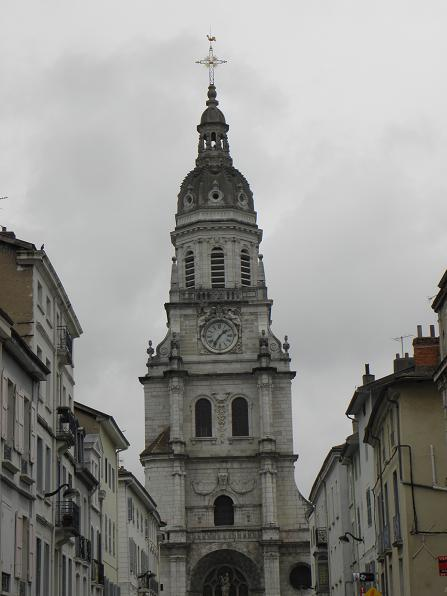
Tower of Bourg-en-Bresse Cathedral

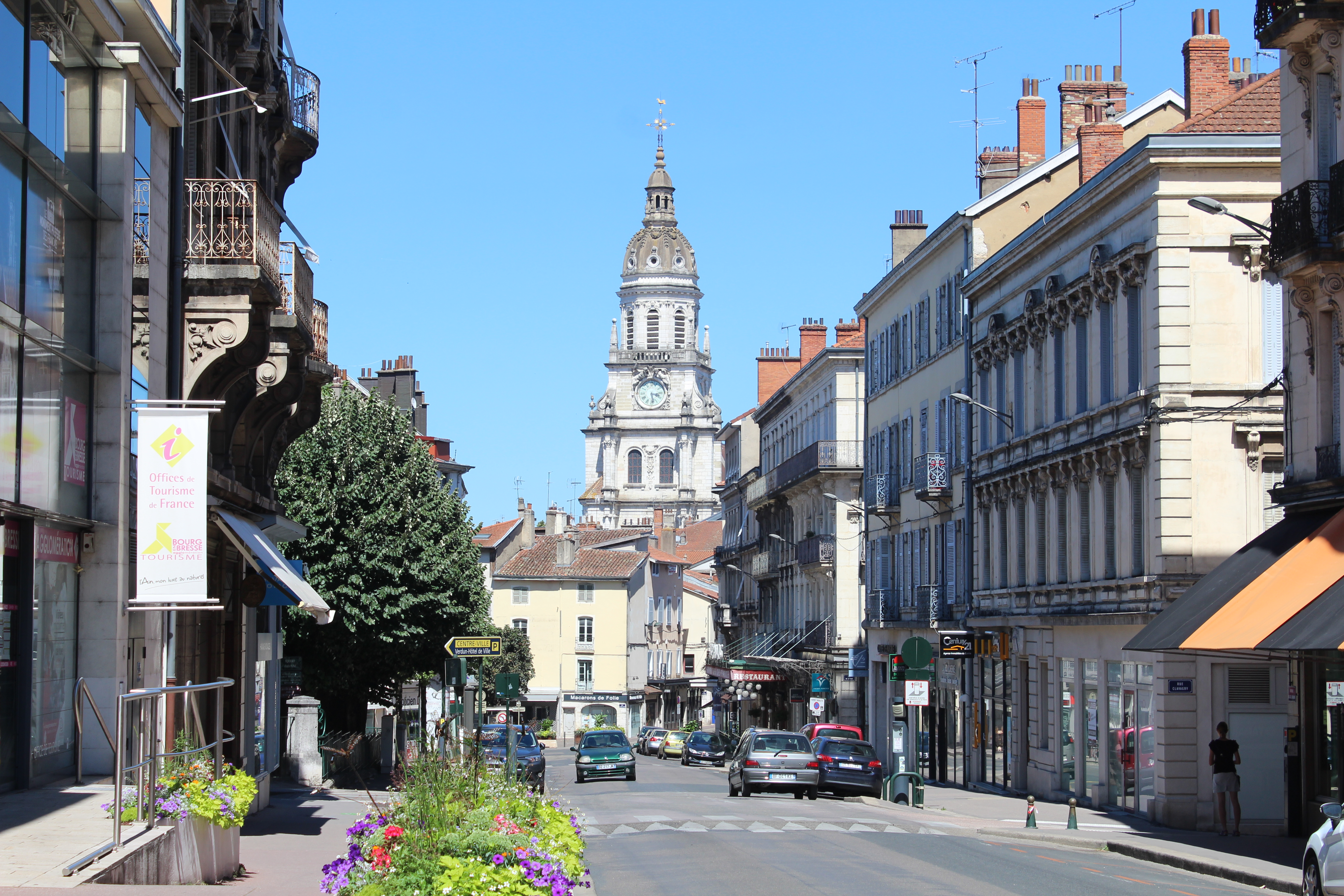
Alsace-Lorraine Avenue

Bourg-en-Bresse Cathedral (Concathédrale Notre-Dame-de-l'Annonciation de Bourg-en-Bresse) is a Roman Catholic cathedral in Bourg-en-Bresse, France.

This church was previously the collegiate church of Notre-Dame-du-Bourg, which in 1992 was raised to the status of co-cathedral of the Diocese of Belley-Ars, as the bishop and diocesan administration of Belley, later Belley-Ars, had been resident in Bourg-en-Bresse since 1978.

Artistic holdings of the cathedral include a Pietà in oil by Anne Bricollet, signed and dated 1785.

== Details of the Cathedral ==
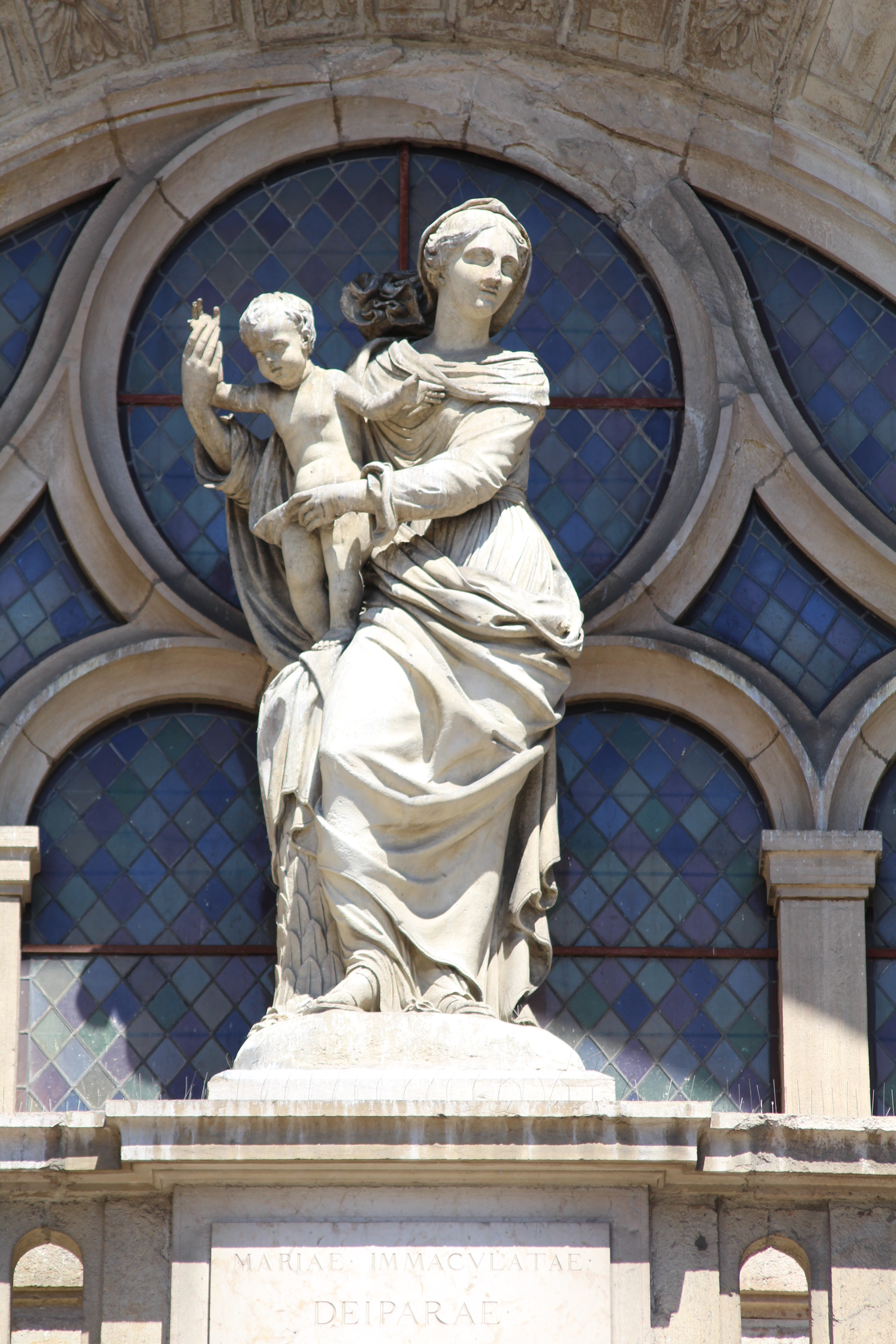
Virgin and Child

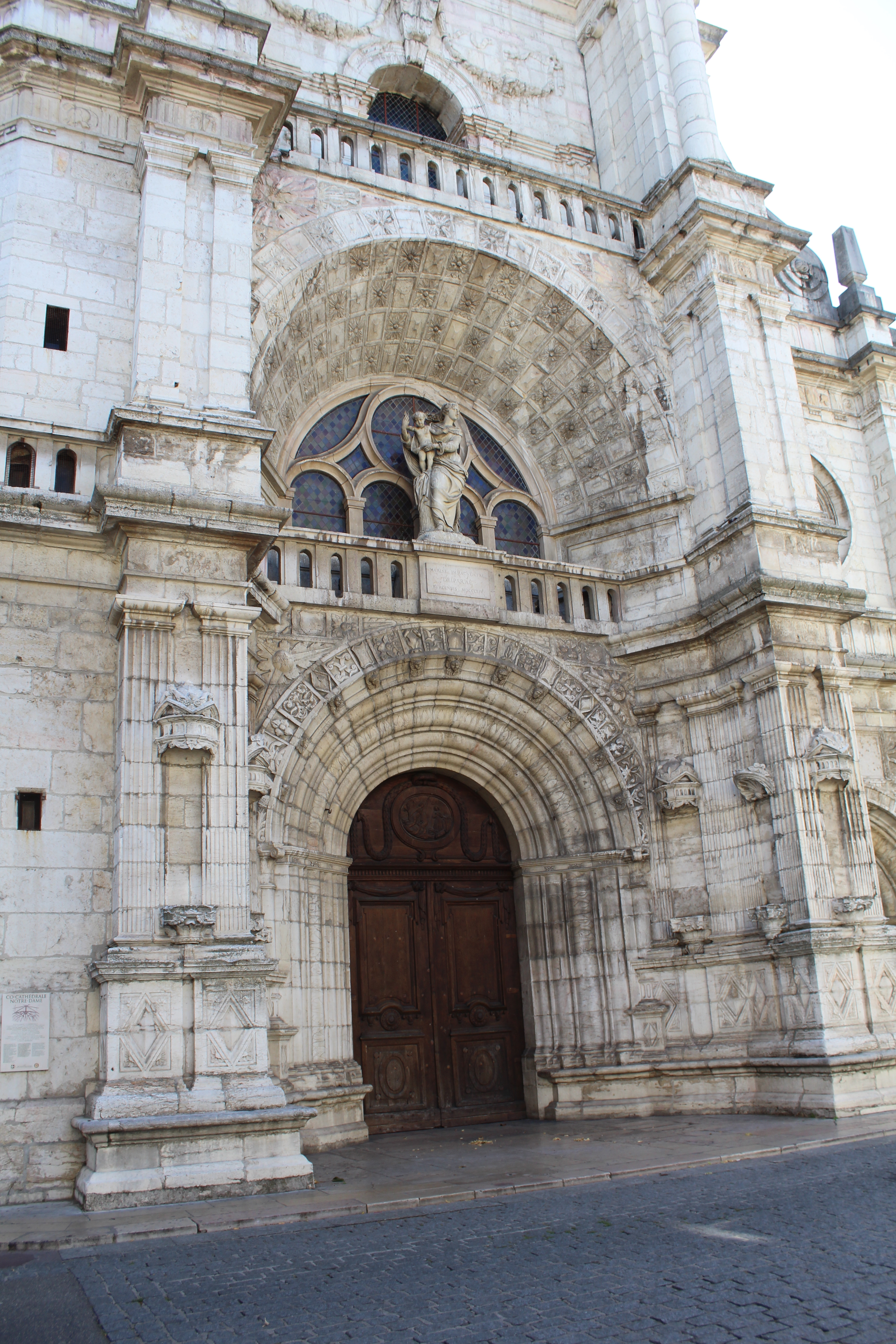
Entrance

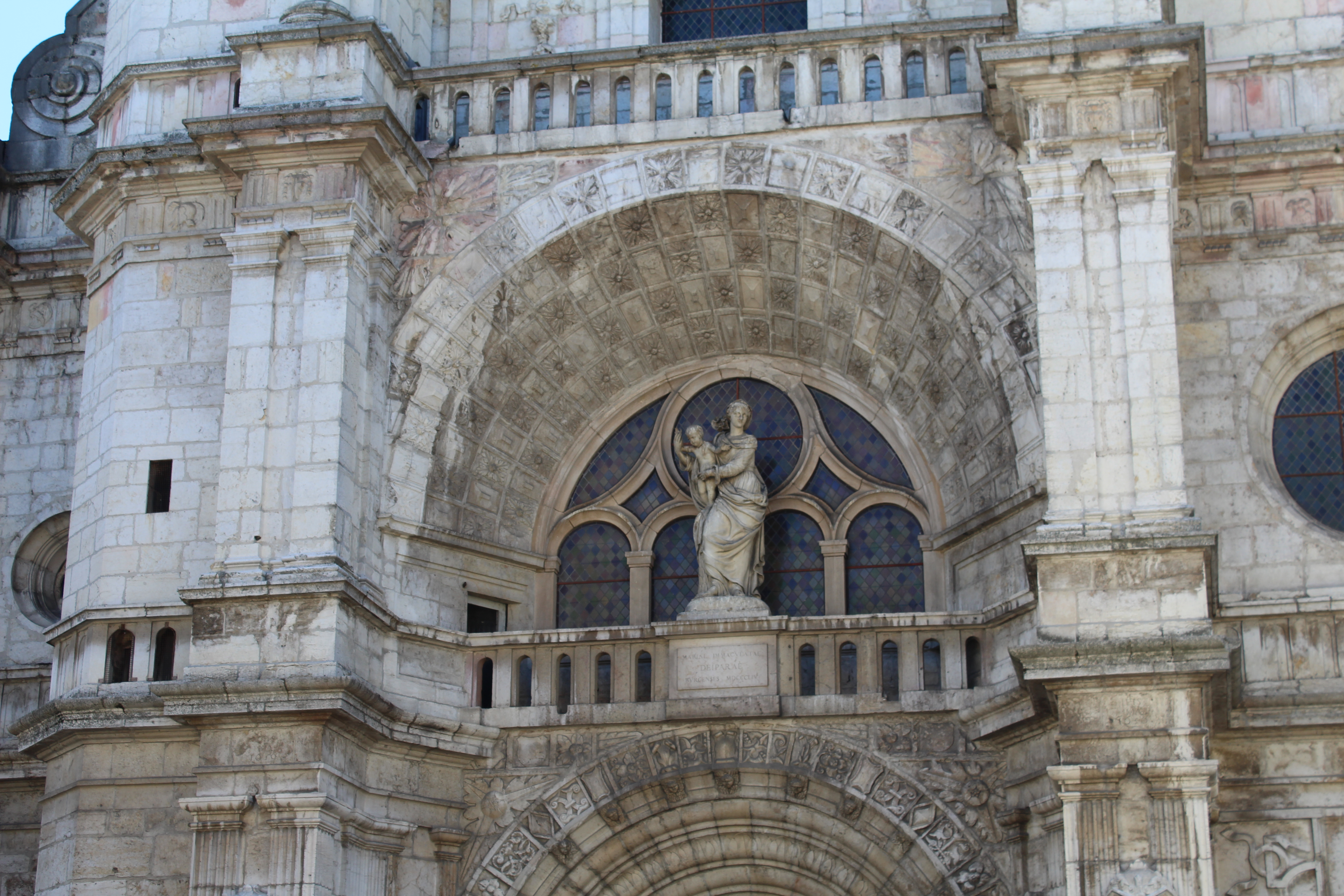
Above the entrance

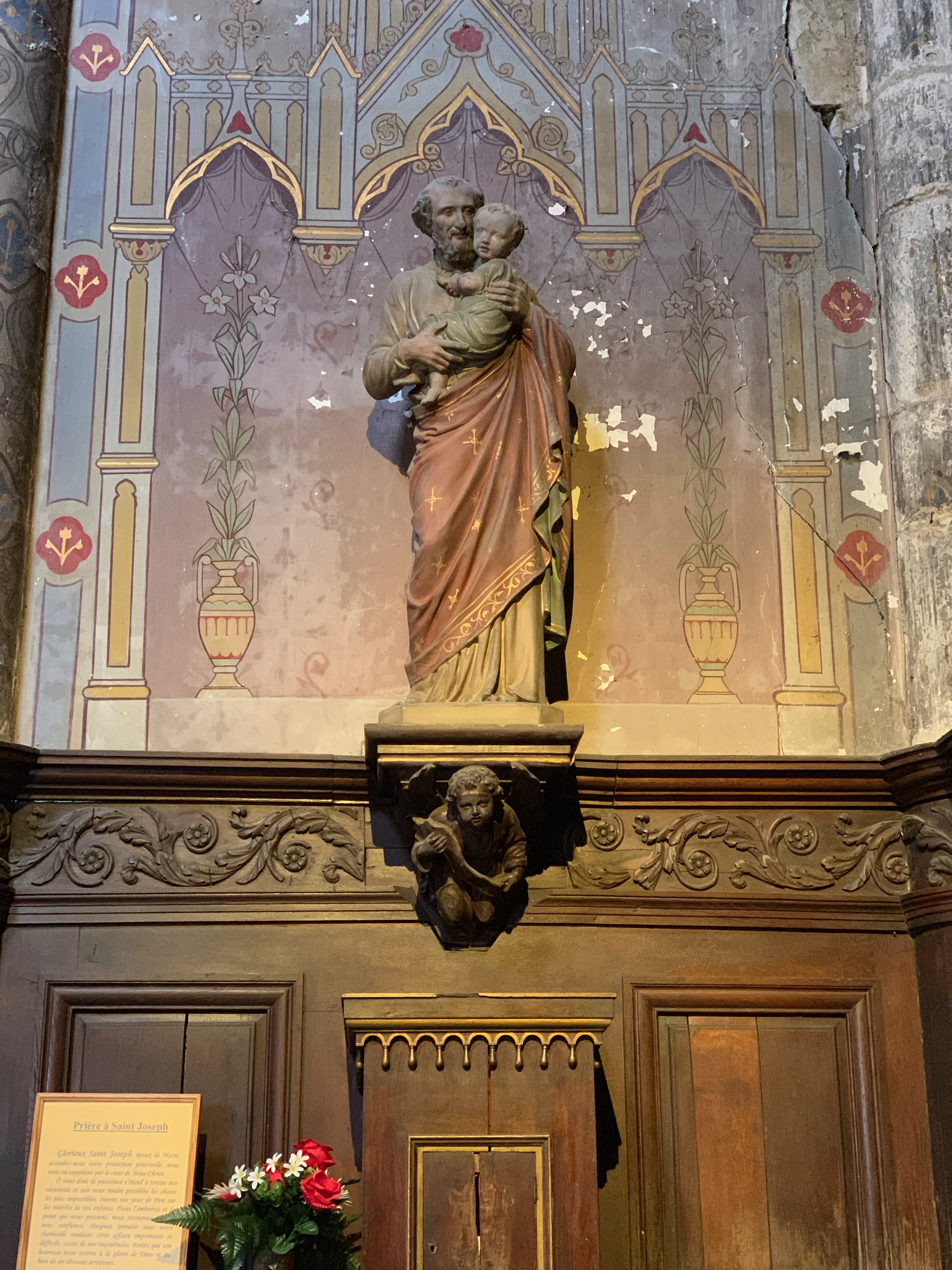
Saint Joseph

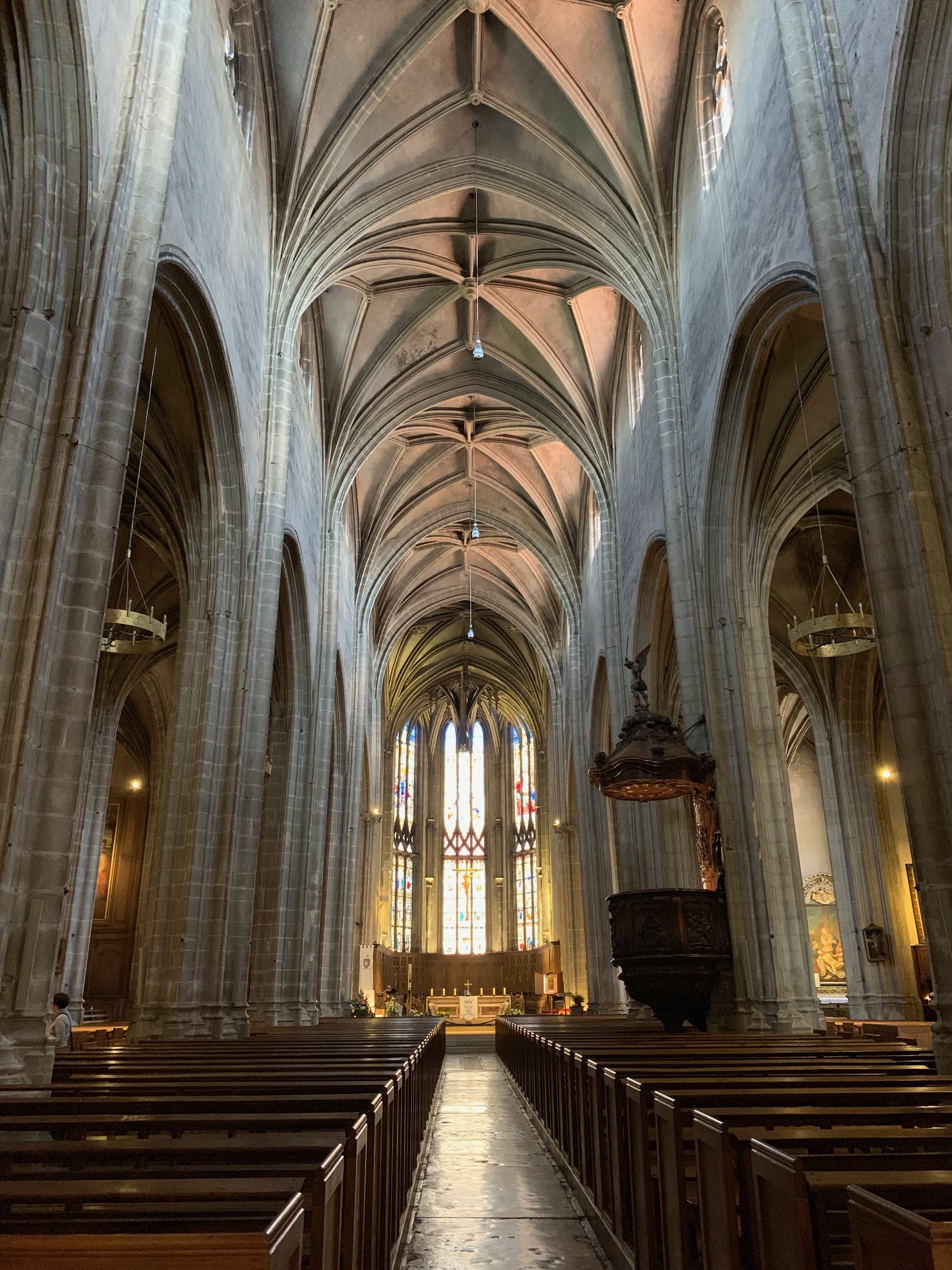
Main alley

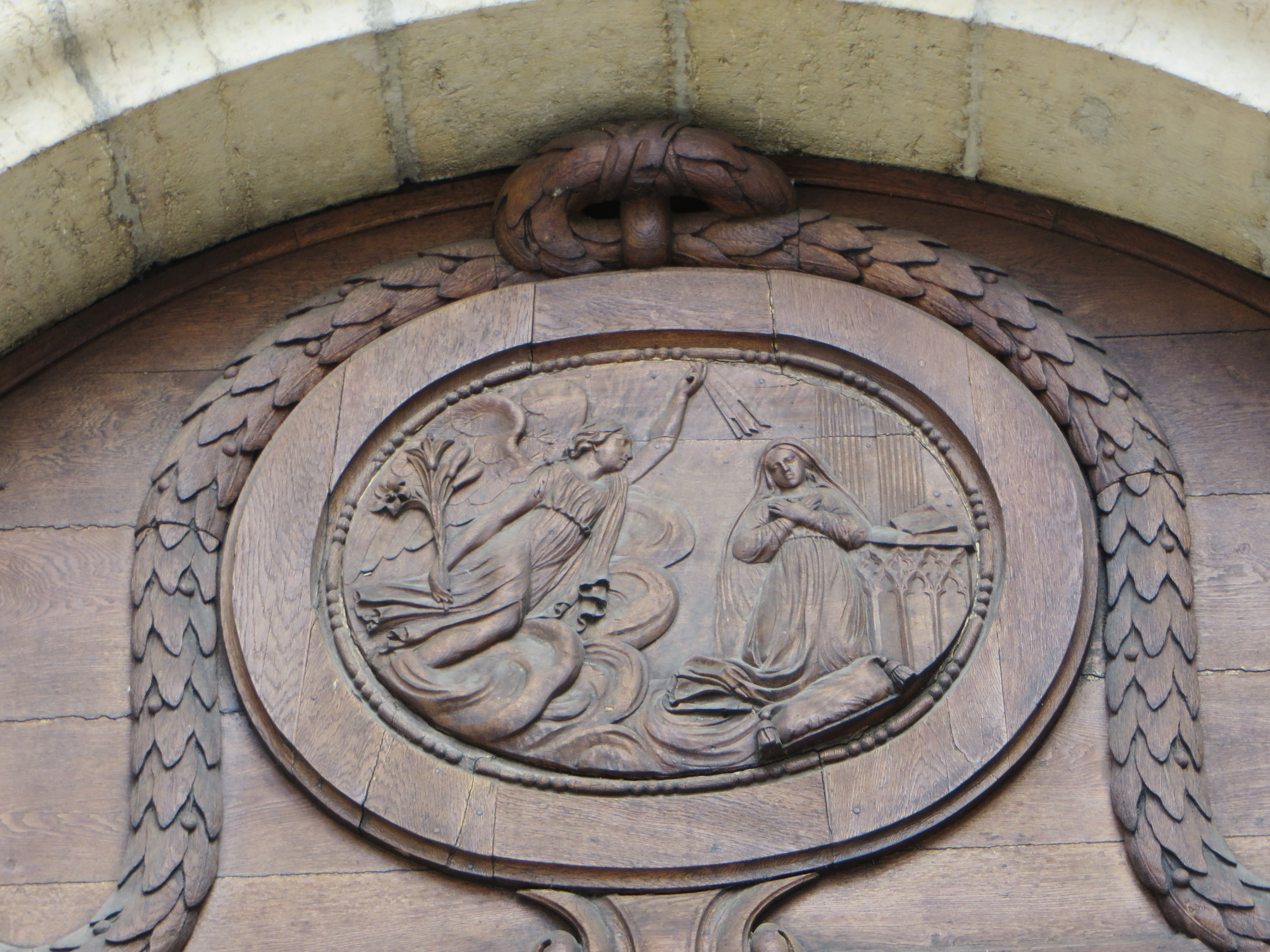
Annunciation

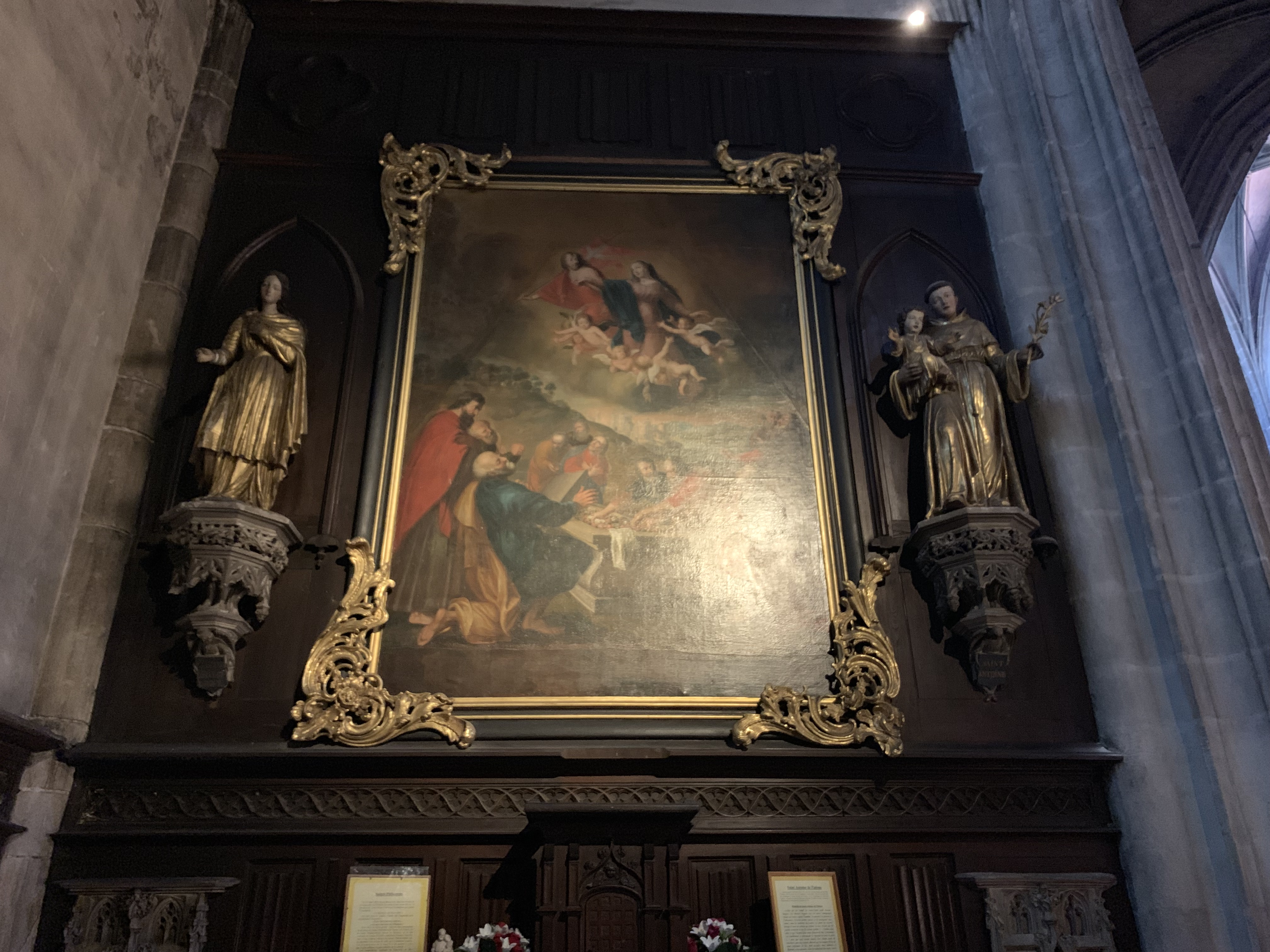
Painting by Benoît Alhoste

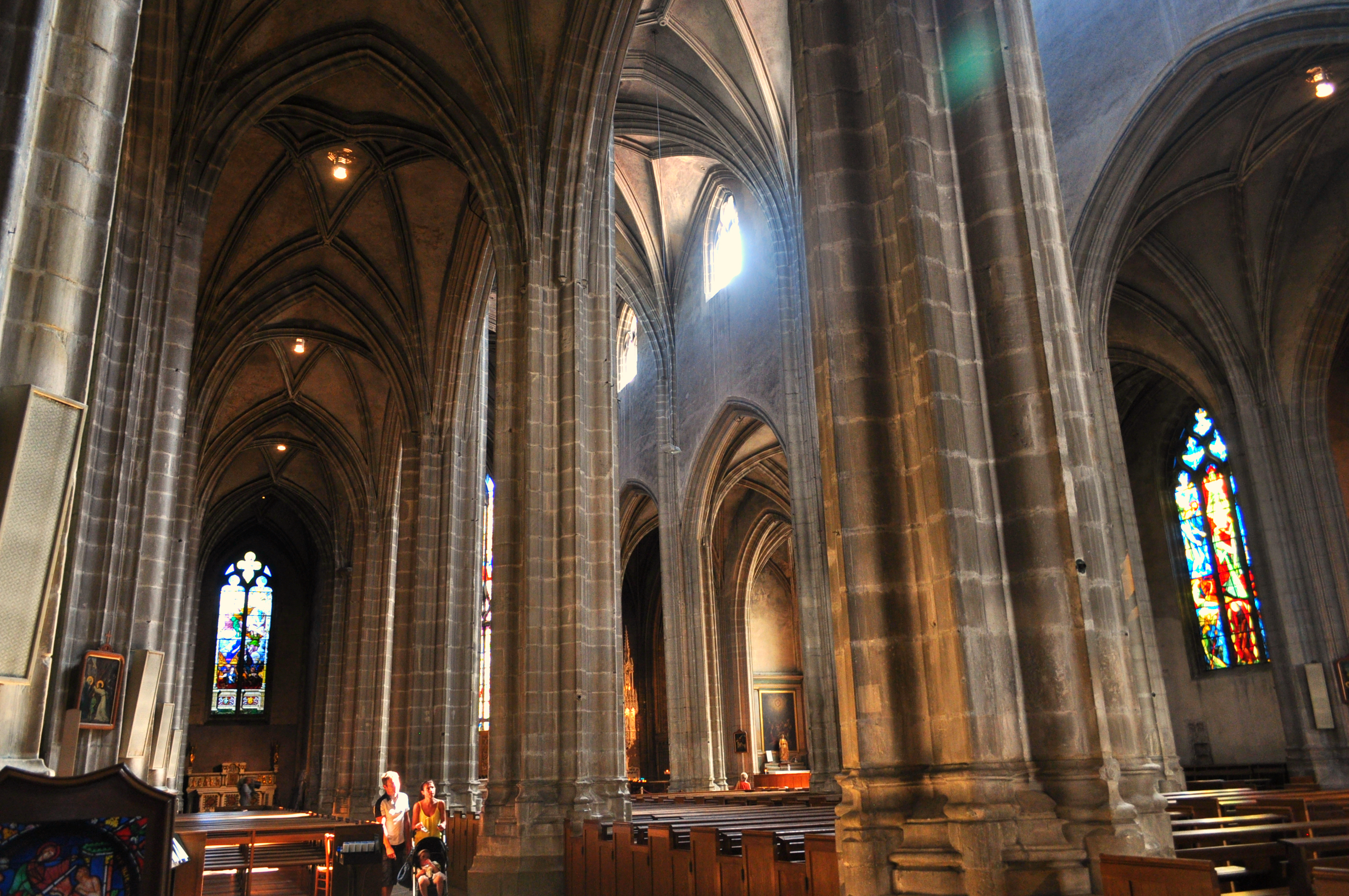
Interior

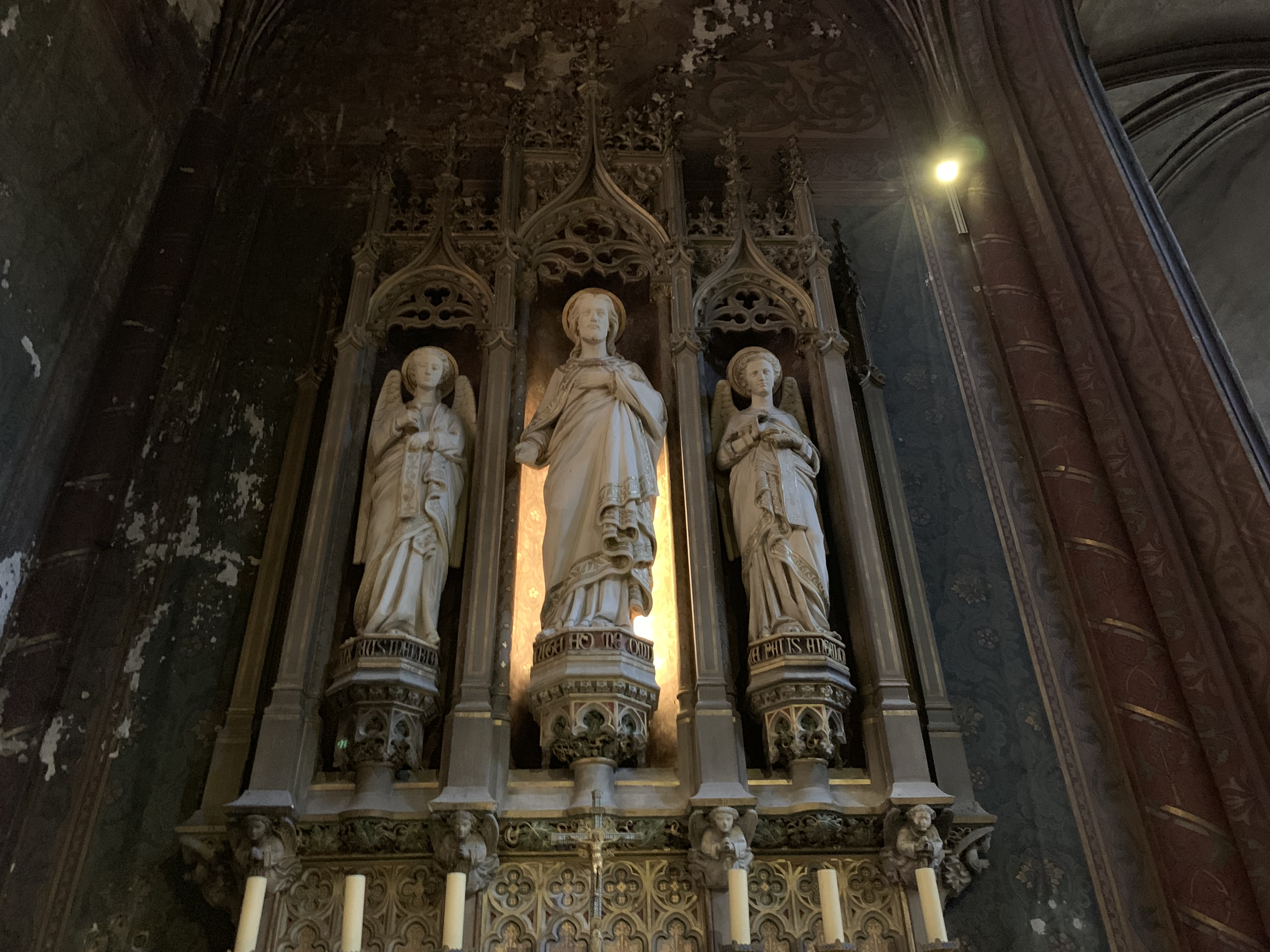
Altar located in the Chapel of the Sacred Heart

== Sources ==
- Brief account of Bourg-en-Bresse Cathedral
