= Bourg-en-Bresse =

Prefecture and commune in Auvergne-Rhône-Alpes, France

Bourg-en-Bresse Bôrg (Arpitan)
- Prefecture and commune
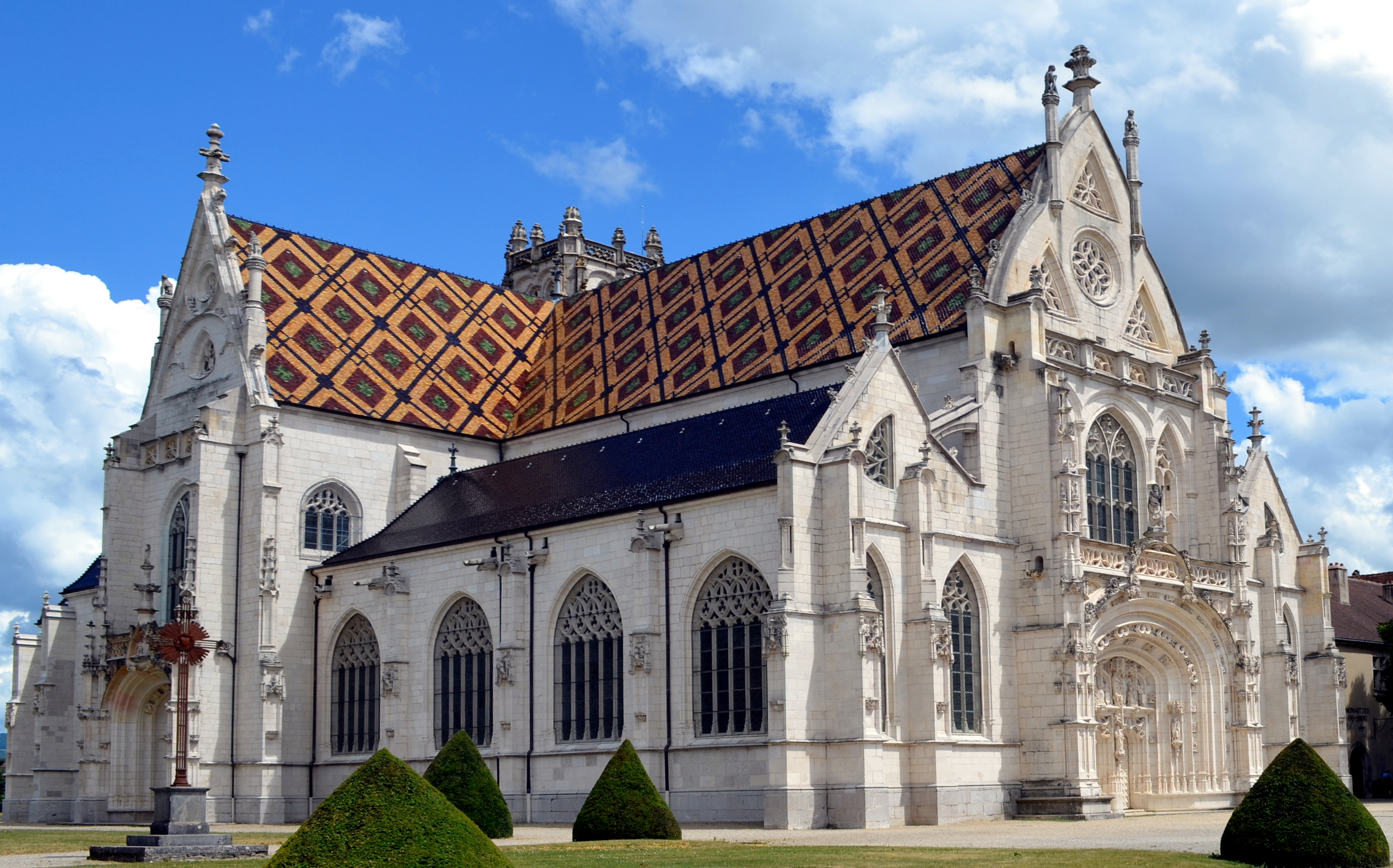
- A view of the Church of Saint-Nicolas-de-Tolentin at the Royal Monastery of Brou

- Flag Coat of arms
- Location of Bourg-en-Bresse
- Location within France Location within Auvergne-Rhône-Alpes
- Coordinates: 46°12′20″N 5°13′44″E
- Country: France
- Region: Auvergne-Rhône-Alpes
- Department: Ain
- Arrondissement: Bourg-en-Bresse
- Canton: Bourg-en-Bresse-1 and 2
- Intercommunality: CA Bassin de Bourg-en-Bresse

Government
  - Mayor (2026–32): Jean-François Debat
- Area^{1}: 23.99 km^{2} (9.26 sq mi)
- Elevation: 240 m (790 ft)
- Highest elevation: 273 m (896 ft)
- Lowest elevation: 220 m (720 ft)
- Population (2023): 42,372
  - Density: 1,766/km^{2} (4,575/sq mi)
- Demonym: Burgiens
- Time zone: UTC+01:00 (CET)
  - Summer (DST): UTC+02:00 (CEST)
- INSEE/Postal code: 01053 /01000
- Website: www.bourgenbresse.fr
- ^{1} French Land Register data, which excludes lakes, ponds, glaciers > 1 km^{2} (0.386 sq mi or 247 acres) and river estuaries.

Bourg-en-Bresse (French pronunciation: [buʁ(k)‿ɑ̃ bʁɛs]; lit. 'Bourg-in-Bresse'; Arpitan: Bôrg) is the prefecture of the Ain department in the Auvergne-Rhône-Alpes region in Eastern France. Located 70 km (43 mi) northeast of Lyon, it is the capital of the ancient province of Bresse (Arpitan: Brêsse).

== Geography ==
Bourg-en-Bresse is located at the western base of the Jura Mountains, on the left bank of the Reyssouze, a tributary of the Saône. It lies 70 kilometres (43 mi) northeast of Lyon and 50 kilometres (31 mi) south-southwest of Lons-le-Saunier.

== History ==
Roman remains have been discovered at Bourg, but little is known of its early history. It was probably pillaged by Goths in Late Antiquity. Raised to the rank of a free town in 1250, it was at the beginning of the 15th century the capital of the dukes of Savoy in the province of Bresse. In February 1535, it was conquered by France during a full-scale invasion of Savoy, but was restored to Duke Philibert Emmanuel in 1559, when he married Henry II's sister Marguerite. The duke later built a strong citadel, which afterwards withstood a six-months' siege by the soldiers of Henry IV during the Franco-Savoyard War of 1600–1601. The town was finally ceded to France in 1601. In 1814, the inhabitants, in spite of the defenseless condition of their town, offered resistance to the Austrians, who put the place to pillage.

== Demographics ==
Historical population

Year	Pop.	±% p.a.
1793	6,533	—
1800	6,984	+0.96%
1806	7,417	+1.01%
1821	8,132	+0.62%
1831	8,996	+1.01%
1836	9,528	+1.16%
1841	10,219	+1.41%
1846	10,308	+0.17%
1851	12,068	+3.20%
1856	11,676	−0.66%
1861	14,052	+3.77%
1866	13,733	−0.46%
1872	14,280	+0.65%
1876	15,692	+2.39%
1881	18,233	+3.05%
1886	18,113	−0.13%
1891	18,968	+0.93%
1896	18,501	−0.50%
1901	18,887	+0.41%

Year	Pop.	±% p.a.
1906	20,045	+1.20%
1911	20,545	+0.49%
1921	20,191	−0.17%
1926	20,364	+0.17%
1931	23,117	+2.57%
1936	24,746	+1.37%
1946	25,944	+0.47%
1954	26,699	+0.36%
1962	32,596	+2.53%
1968	37,887	+2.54%
1975	42,181	+1.55%
1982	41,098	−0.37%
1990	40,972	−0.04%
1999	40,666	−0.08%
2007	40,506	−0.05%
2012	40,171	−0.17%
2017	41,527	+0.67%
2023	42,372	+0.34%

Source: EHESS and INSEE (1968-2023)

== Politics ==
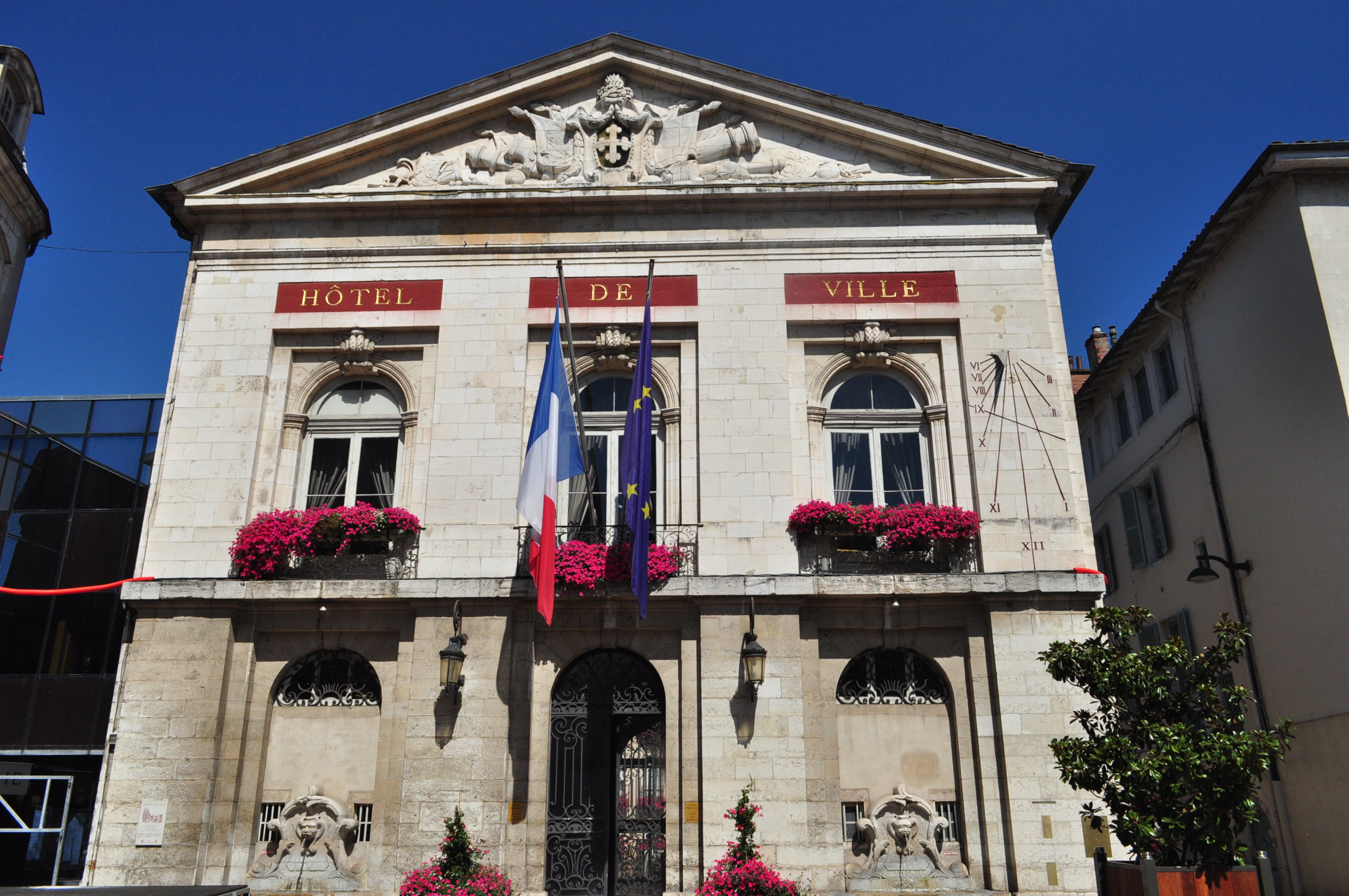
The Hôtel de Ville

Since 2008, Jean-François Debat of the Socialist Party (PS) has been Mayor of Bourg-en-Bresse. He was reelected following the 2026 municipal election.

In the four last presidential elections, Bourg-en-Bresse voted as following:

Election	Winning candidate	Party	%
2017	Emmanuel Macron	EM	72.37
2012	François Hollande	PS	53.96
2007	Nicolas Sarkozy	UMP	50.83
2002	Jacques Chirac	RPR	84.46

== Sights ==
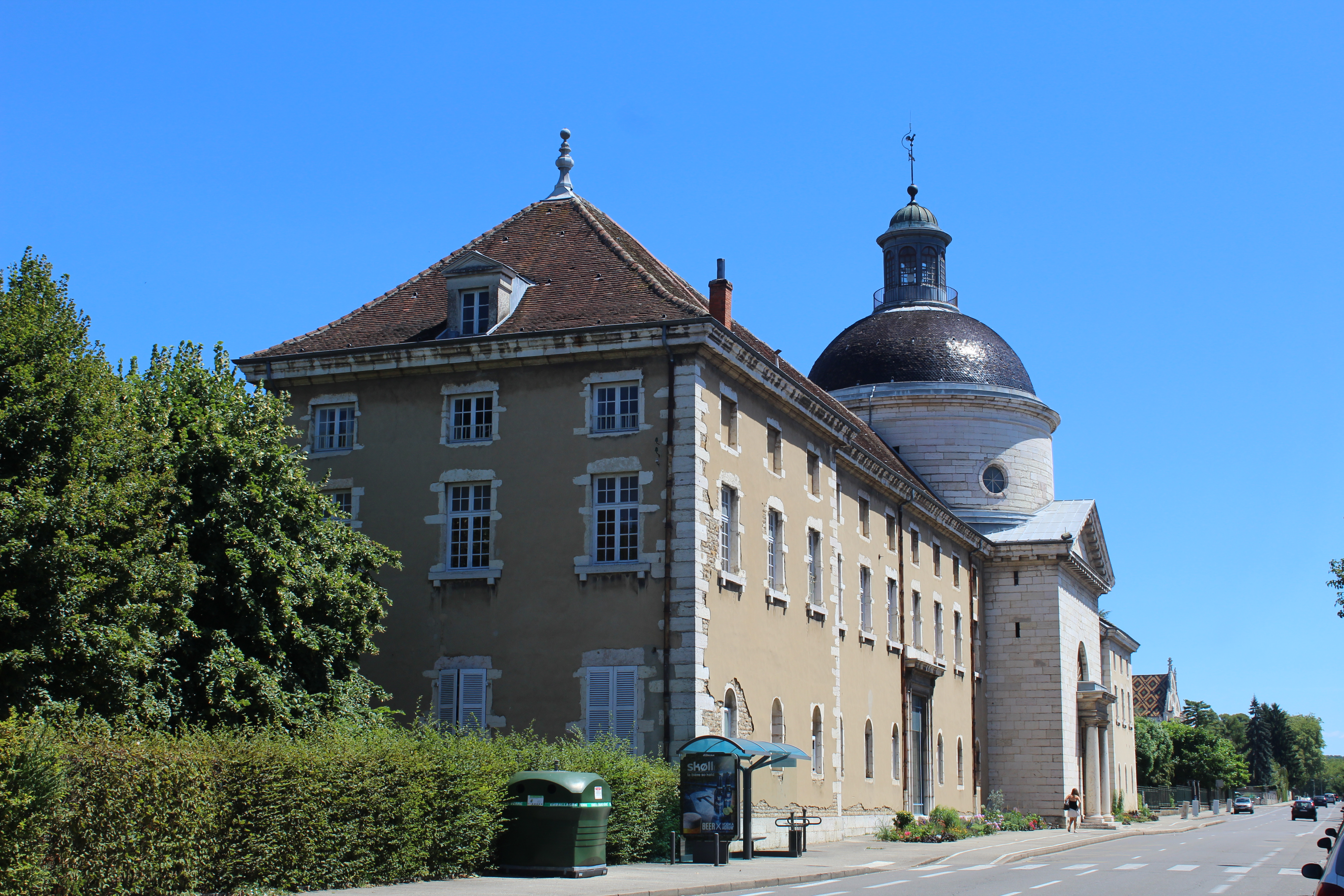
Hôtel-Dieu de Bourg-en-Bresse

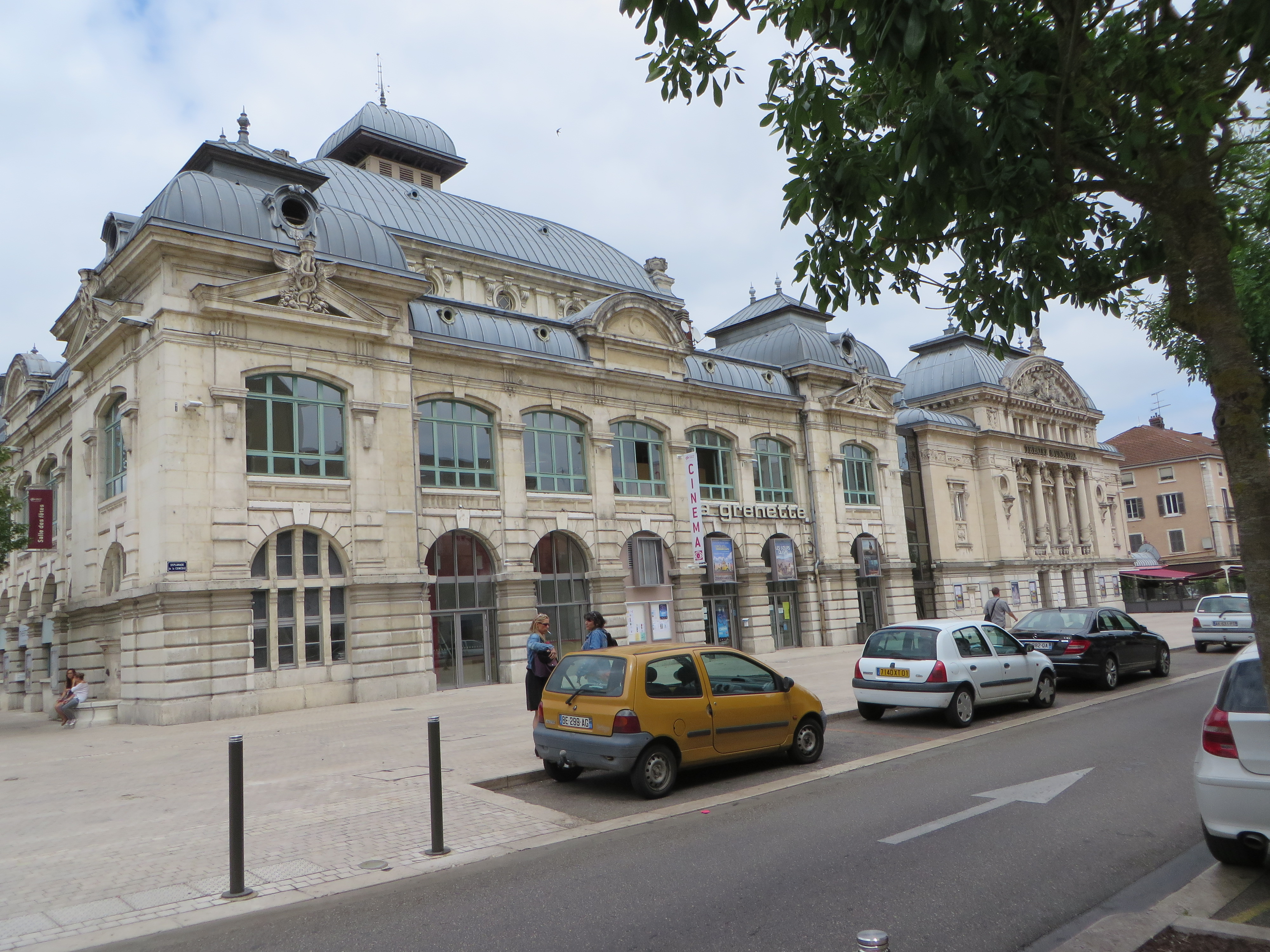
Théâtre de Bourg-en-Bresse

Bourg-en-Bresse Cathedral, also known as the church of Notre-Dame (Cathédrale Notre-Dame-de-l'Annonciation de Bourg-en-Bresse), which dates back to the 16th century, has a façade built in the Renaissance; other parts of the church are Gothic. In the interior there are stalls of the 16th century.

The other public buildings, including a handsome prefecture, are modern. The Hôtel de Ville (town hall) contains a library and the Lorin Museum with a collection of pictures, while another museum has a collection of old costumes and ornaments characteristic of Bresse. Among the statues in the town there is one of historian Edgar Quinet, a native of Bourg-en-Bresse.

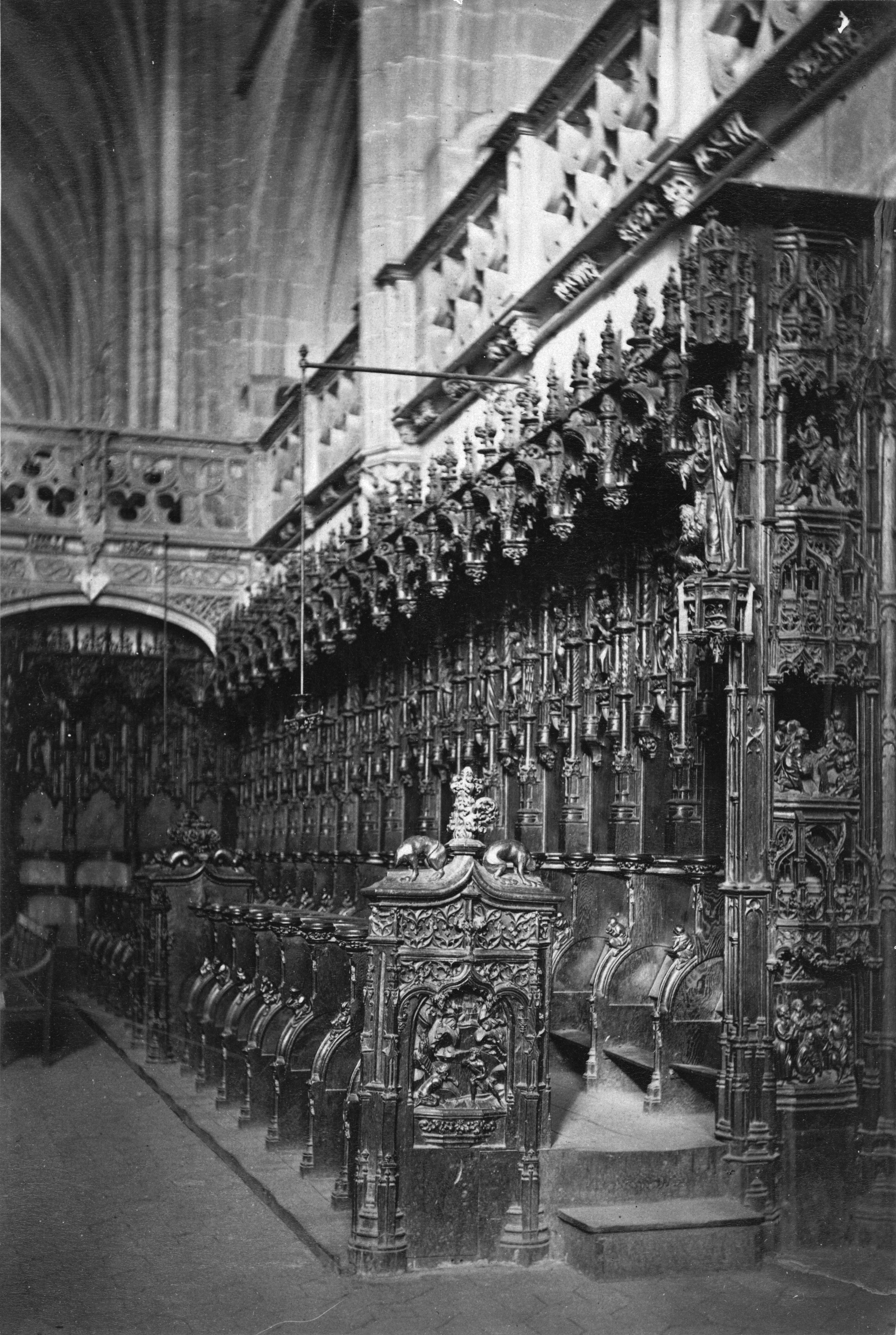
Stalls in the Church of Brou, albumen print, c. 1865–1886

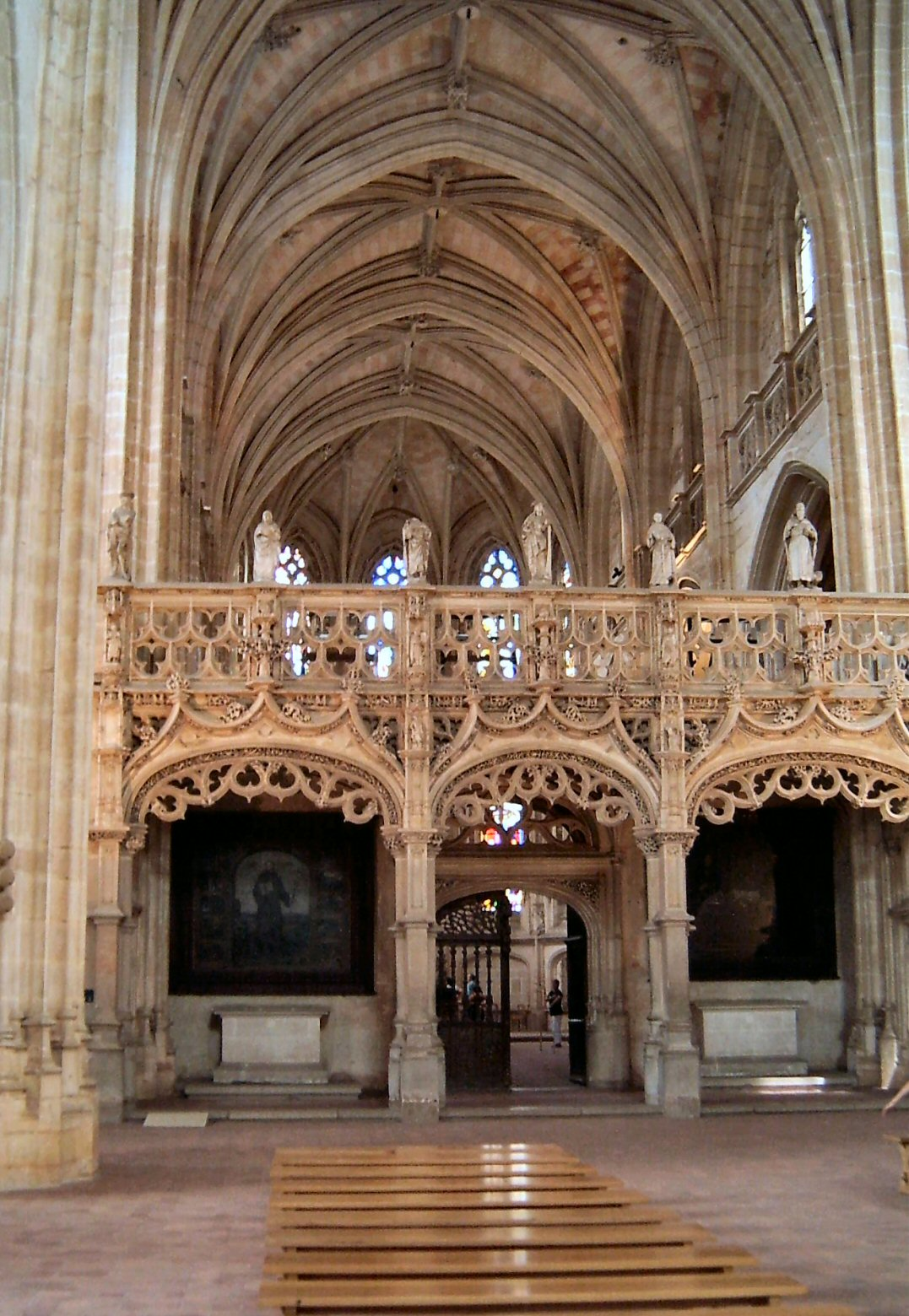
Interior of the Church of Brou

The Royal Monastery of Brou, named after the suburb settlement of Bourg-en-Bresse in which it lies, is of great artistic interest. Margaret of Bourbon, wife of Philip II of Savoy, had intended to found a monastery on the spot, but died before her intention could be carried into effect. The church was actually built early in the 16th century by her daughter-in-law Margaret of Austria, wife of Philibert le Beau of Savoy, in memory of her husband.

The exterior, especially the façade, is richly ornamented, but the chief interest lies in the works of art in the interior, which date from 1532. The most important are the three mausoleums with the marble effigies of Marguerite of Bourbon, Philibert le Beau and Margaret of Austria. All three are remarkable for perfection of sculpture and richness of ornamentation. The rood loft, the oak stalls and the reredos in the chapel of the Virgin are masterpieces in a similar style. The monastery has three cloisters from the early 16th century. The church and the cloisters are listed monuments.

== Economy ==
In the early 20th century, the city manufactured iron goods, mineral waters, tallow, soap and earthenware. There were flour mills and breweries; there is considerable trade in grain, cattle and poultry.

== Transport ==
Bourg-en-Bresse station offers rail connections to Paris, Strasbourg, Lyon and Geneva by high-speed rail, as well as several regional destinations with TER Auvergne-Rhône-Alpes services. The A39 motorway connects Bourg with Dole and Dijon, the A40 with Mâcon and Geneva. The nearest airports are Lyon–Saint-Exupéry Airport, located 93 km (58 mi) to the south and Geneva Airport, located 133 km (83 mi) to the west Bourg-en-Bresse.

== Sport ==
Football Bourg-en-Bresse Péronnas 01 is based in the town.

On 3 May 1953, a motorcycle racing meeting was held on a circuit going past the Residence Emile Pélicand and the Jardin d'Enfants Emile Pélicand.

== Miscellaneous ==
Bourg is the prefecture of the department and the location of a court of assizes; it has a tribunal of first instance, a tribunal and a chamber of commerce, as well as a local branch of the Bank of France.

Bourg-en-Bresse was the finish of Stage 6 and the departure of Stage 7 in the 2007 Tour de France.

== Personalities ==
Bourg-en-Bresse is the birthplace of:

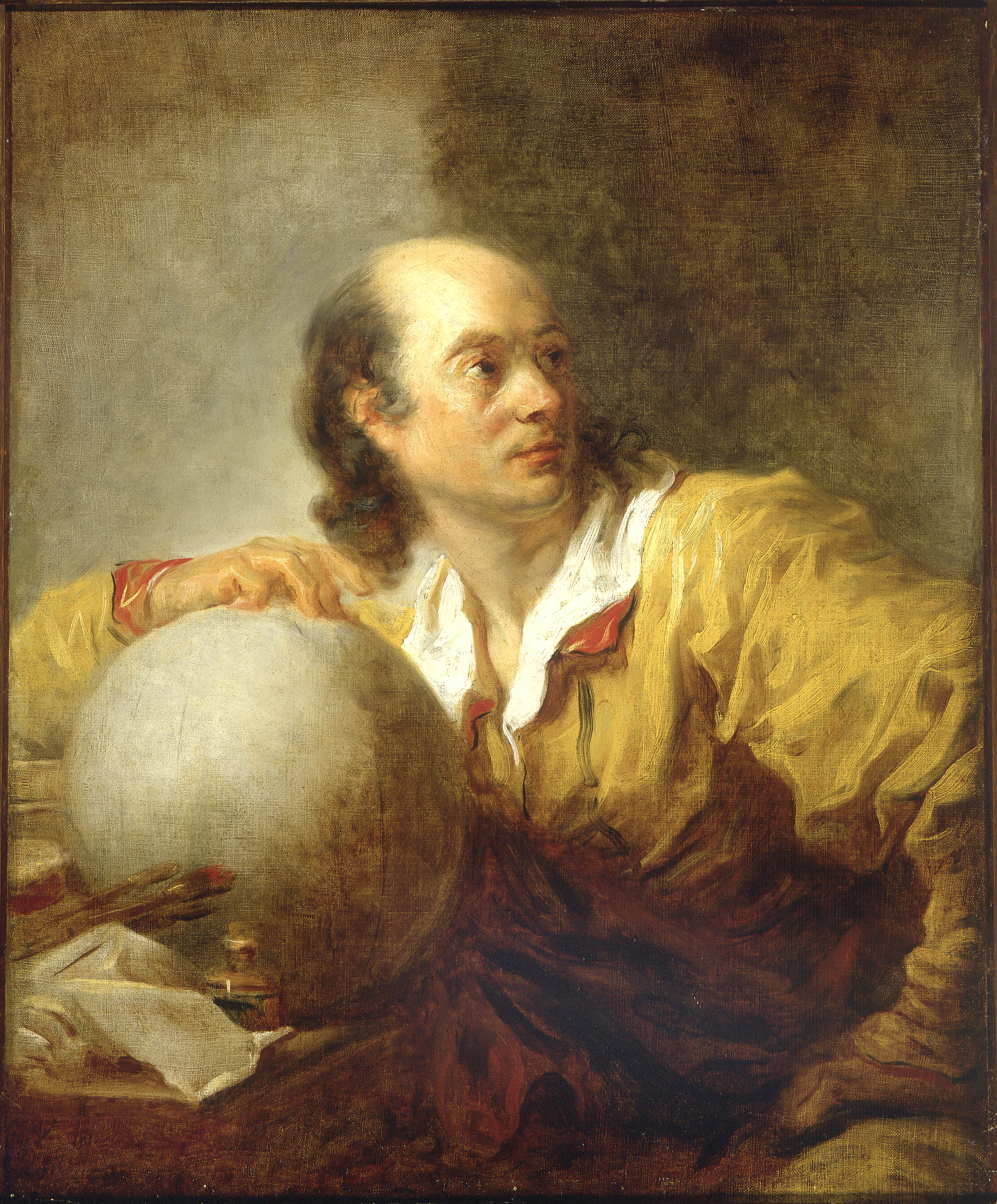
Jérôme Lalande, c. 1769

- Claude Gaspard Bachet de Méziriac (1581–1638), mathematician
- Julien Benneteau (born 1981), tennis player
- Georges Blanc (born 1943), chef
- Raymond Chevallier (1929–2004), historian and archaeologist
- François Clerc (born 1983), footballer for Olympique Lyonnais and France
- Alain Giletti (born 1939), ice skater
- Jérôme Lalande (1732–1807), astronomer, freemason and writer.
- Isabelle Lonvis-Rome (born 1963), magistrate and minister
- Daniel Morelon (born 1944), cyclist
- Jean-Bernard Gauthier de Murnan (1748–1796), French officer for the Continental Army and general during the French Revolution
- Lionel Nallet (born 1976), international rugby union player
- Jacques Pépin (born 1935), chef
- Edgar Quinet (1803–1875), historian and man of letters.
- Jérôme Tafani (born 1958), businessman
- Léo Wanner (1886–1941), communist, anti-fascist, and anti-imperialist activist and journalist

== Twin towns – sister cities ==
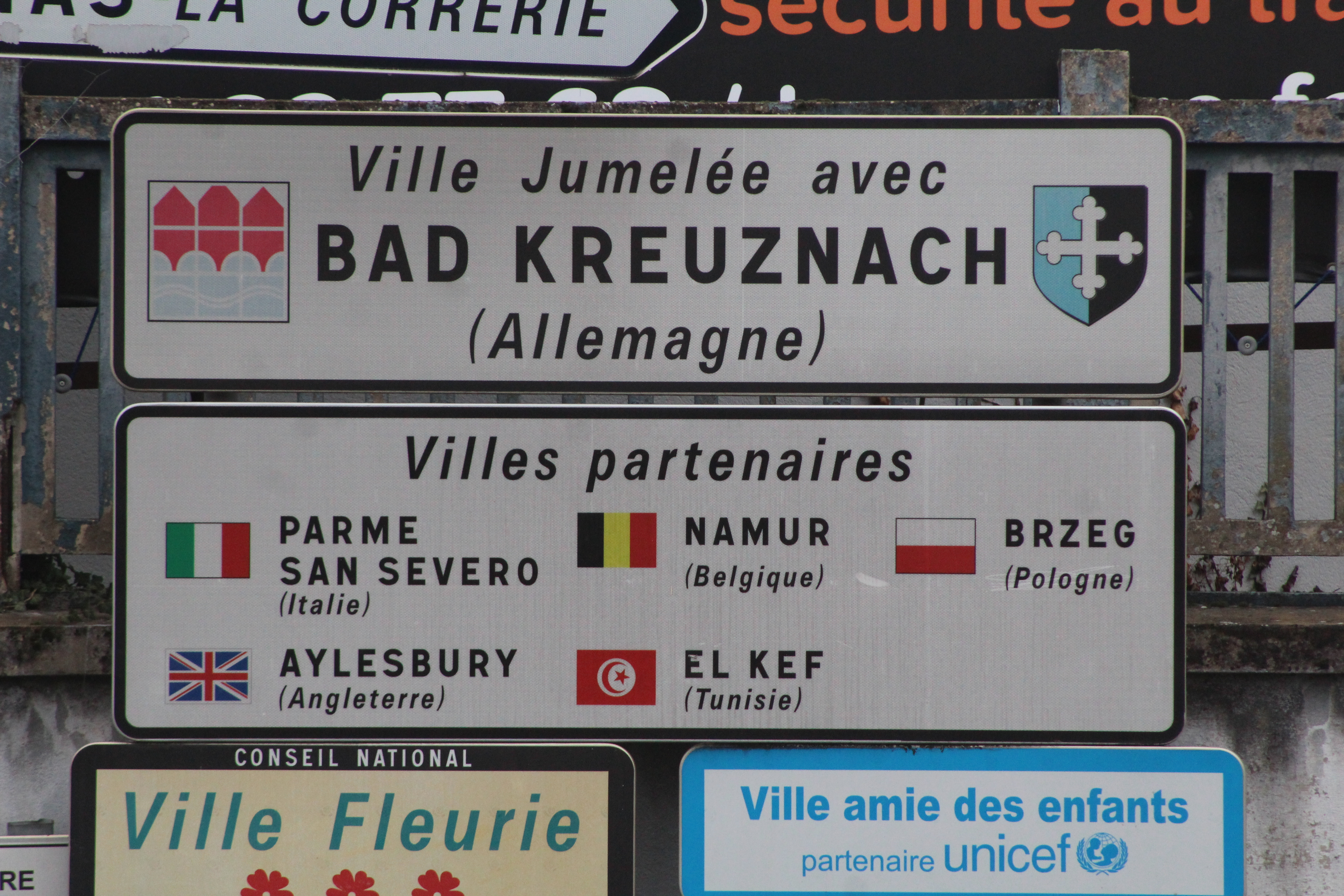
Twin town and partner cities

Bourg-en-Bresse is twinned with:

- Bad Kreuznach, Germany
- Aylesbury, England
- San Severo, Italy
- Parma, Italy
- Namur, Belgium
- Brzeg, Poland
- El Kef, Tunisia

== Climate ==
Climate data for Bourg-en-Bresse (Ceyzériat) (1994–2020 normals, extremes 1994–present)
Month	Jan	Feb	Mar	Apr	May	Jun	Jul	Aug	Sep	Oct	Nov	Dec	Year
Record high °C (°F)	18.4 (65.1)	20.5 (68.9)	25.4 (77.7)	28.4 (83.1)	32.9 (91.2)	36.7 (98.1)	38.5 (101.3)	39.2 (102.6)	33.6 (92.5)	27.3 (81.1)	22.5 (72.5)	17.4 (63.3)	39.2 (102.6)
Mean daily maximum °C (°F)	6.1 (43.0)	8.1 (46.6)	12.9 (55.2)	16.9 (62.4)	20.8 (69.4)	24.7 (76.5)	26.6 (79.9)	26.4 (79.5)	21.9 (71.4)	17.0 (62.6)	10.5 (50.9)	6.7 (44.1)	16.5 (61.7)
Daily mean °C (°F)	3.1 (37.6)	4.1 (39.4)	7.6 (45.7)	11.2 (52.2)	15.1 (59.2)	18.7 (65.7)	20.4 (68.7)	20.1 (68.2)	16.2 (61.2)	12.6 (54.7)	7.0 (44.6)	3.8 (38.8)	11.7 (53.1)
Mean daily minimum °C (°F)	0.1 (32.2)	0.2 (32.4)	2.3 (36.1)	5.4 (41.7)	9.3 (48.7)	12.7 (54.9)	14.2 (57.6)	13.9 (57.0)	10.6 (51.1)	8.2 (46.8)	3.6 (38.5)	0.9 (33.6)	6.8 (44.2)
Record low °C (°F)	−15.3 (4.5)	−17.0 (1.4)	−13.2 (8.2)	−5.5 (22.1)	−1.3 (29.7)	2.1 (35.8)	5.3 (41.5)	3.3 (37.9)	−0.7 (30.7)	−7.1 (19.2)	−11.4 (11.5)	−17.6 (0.3)	−17.6 (0.3)
Average precipitation mm (inches)	81.1 (3.19)	69.1 (2.72)	74.5 (2.93)	85.8 (3.38)	101.3 (3.99)	75.5 (2.97)	80.9 (3.19)	86.5 (3.41)	79.5 (3.13)	103.9 (4.09)	108.0 (4.25)	86.5 (3.41)	1,032.6 (40.65)
Average precipitation days (≥ 1.0 mm)	12.0	10.3	10.0	9.8	11.1	9.1	8.5	8.8	8.6	10.9	11.3	12.7	123.2
Source: Meteociel

== See also ==
- Arpitania
- Bressan
- Bresse chicken
- Communes of the Ain department
- Pierre-Marie Poisson
