= 2020 Ain municipal elections =

- 15 March 2020 and 28 June 2020

The 2020 Ain municipal elections took place on 15 March 2020, with a second round of voting initially expected for 22 March 2020. Like the rest of France, the second round was initially suspended due to the COVID-19 pandemic. On 22 May, Prime Minister Édouard Philippe announced that the second round of voting would take place on 28 June.

== Incumbent and elected mayors ==
The election was marked by political stability, with the right remaining largely the majority political force in the department. The left, having largely been defeated in 2014, was unable to regain seats lost in Ambérieu-en-Bugey, Attignat, Belley, Ferney-Voltaire, Montluel, Ornex, Prévessin-Moëns, Trévoux and Villars-les-Dombes. In 2020, the left continued its political erosion by losing seats in Miribel and Reyrieux, but was consoled with the re-election of Jean-François Debat (PS) in Bourg-en-Bresse.

Incumbent and elected mayors for communes with population of more than 3,000 inhabitants
Commune	Population (2017)	Incumbent mayor	Party	Elected mayor	Party
Ambérieu-en-Bugey	14,035	Daniel Fabre	UDI	Daniel Fabre	UDI
Arbent	3,367	Liliane Maissiat	LR	Philippe Cracchiolo	SE
Attignat	3,211	Walter Martin	DVD	Walter Martin	DVD
Bâgé-Dommartin	4,092	Dominique Repiquet	DVD	Christian Berginaud	SE
Béligneux	3,333	Francis Sigoire	DVD	Jacques Piot	SE
Belley	9,103	Pierre Berthet	DVD	Dimitri Lahuerta	LR
Bellignat	3,624	Jean-Georges Arbant	PS	Véronique Ravet	DVG
Beynost	4,613	Caroline Terrier	LR	Caroline Terrier	LR
Bourg-en-Bresse	41,527	Jean-François Debat	PS	Jean-François Debat	PS
Cessy	4,856	Christophe Bouvier	DVD	Christine Bouvier	DVD
Ceyzériat	3,157	Jean-Yves Flochon	LR	Jean-Yves Flochon	LR
Châtillon-sur-Chalaronne	4,859	Patrick Mathias	LR	Patrick Mathias	LR
Culoz	3,035	Franck André-Masse	DVD	Franck André-Masse	DVD
Dagneux	4,717	Bernard Simplex	DVD	Carine Couturier	DVD
Divonne-les-Bains	9,644	Vincent Scattolin	LR	Vincent Scattolin	LR
Feillens	3,108	Guy Billoudet	LR	Guy Billoudet	LR
Ferney-Voltaire	9,766	Daniel Raphoz	UDI	Daniel Raphoz	UDI
Gex	13,118	Patrice Dunand	DVD	Patrice Dunand	DVD
Jassans-Riottier	6,339	Jean-Pierre Reverchon	DVD	Jean-Pierre Reverchon	DVD
La Boisse	3,229	François Drogue	DVD	Gérard Raphanael	SE
Lagnieu	7,143	André Moingeon	LR	André Moingeon	LR
Loyettes	3,146	Jean-Pierre Gagne	DVD	Jean-Pierre Gagne	DVD
Meximieux	7,743	Christian Bussy	LR	Jean-Luc Ramel	DVD
Miribel	9,963	Sylvie Viricel	DVG	Jean-Pierre Gaitet	DVD
Montluel	6,964	Romain Daubie	LR	Romain Daubie	LR
Montmerle-sur-Saône	3,793	Raphaël Lamure	DVD	Philippe Prost	DVD
Montréal-la-Cluse	3,435	Patrick Dufour	DVD	Patrick Dufour	DVD
Nantua	3,446	Jean-Pierre Carminati	DVD	Jean-Pascal Thomasset	DVD
Ornex	4,410	Jean-François Obez	DVD	Jean-François Obez	DVD
Oyonnax	22,427	Michel Perraud	UDI	Michel Perraud	UDI
Péronnas	6,385	Christian Chanel	DVD	Hélène Cedileau	DVD
Plateau d'Hauteville	4,853	Philippe Emin	DVD	Philippe Emin	DVD
Prévessin-Moëns	8,233	Aurélie Charillon	DVD	Aurélie Charillon	DVD
Replonges	3,717	Bertrand Vernoux	LR	Bertrand Vernoux	LR
Reyrieux	4,797	Jacky Dutruc	DVG	Carole Bontemps-Hesdin	SE
Saint-André-de-Corcy	3,354	Jean-Pierre Baron	LR	Ludovic Loreau	SE
Saint-Denis-lès-Bourg	5,747	Guillaume Fauvet	DVG	Guillaume Fauvet	DVG
Saint-Genis-Pouilly	12,544	Hubert Bertrand	PRG	Hubert Bertrand	PRG
Saint-Maurice-de-Beynost	3,967	Pierre Goubet	DVG	Pierre Goubet	DVG
Thoiry	6,845	Muriel Bénier	DVD	Muriel Bénier	DVD
Trévoux	6,687	Marc Péchoux	LR	Marc Péchoux	LR
Valserhône	16,423	Régis Petit	DVD	Régis Petit	DVD
Villars-les-Dombes	4,795	Pierre Larrieu	DVD	Pierre Larrieu	DVD
Villieu-Loyes-Mollon	3,653	Éric Beaufort	DVD	Eric Beaufort	DVD
Viriat	6,418	Bernard Perret	DVD	Bernard Perret	DVD

=== Results by number of mayors elected ===
Change in number of elected mayors by political party
Party	Incumbent mayors	Elected mayors	Change
Miscellaneous right	23	21	▼2
The Republicans	12	10	▼2
Union of Democrats and Independents	3	3	Steady
Total right	38	34	-4
Miscellaneous left	4	3	▼1
Radical Party of the Left	1	1	Steady
Socialist Party	2	1	▼1
Total left	7	5	-2
Sans étiquette	0	6	▲6
Total	45		Steady

== Results in communes with more than 3,000 inhabitants ==
=== Ambérieu-en-Bugey ===
- Incumbent mayor: Daniel Fabre (UDI)
- 33 seats to be elected to the conseil municipal (population in 2017: 14,035 residents)
- 13 seats to be elected to the conseil communautaire (CC de la Plaine de l'Ain)

2020 Ambérieu-en-Bugey municipal election results
Leader	List	First round		Seats	
Leader	List	Votes	%	CM	CC
Daniel Fabre	UDI	1,410	50.97	26	11
Rémi Christin	DVG	630	22.77	4	1
Antoine Marino Morabito	DVG	607	21.94	3	1
Patrick Bouvet	LO	119	4.30	0	0
Valid votes		2,766	96.85		
White votes		32	1.12		
Rejected votes		58	2.03		
Total		2,856	100	33	13
Abstentions		5,253	64.78		
Registered voters - voter turnout		8,109	35.22		

=== Arbent ===
- Incumbent mayor: Liliane Maissiat (LR)
- 23 seats to be elected to the conseil municipal (population in 2017: 3,367 residents)
- 3 seats to be elected to the conseil communautaire (Haut-Bugey Agglomération)

2020 Arbent municipal election results
Leader	List	First round		Seats	
Leader	List	Votes	%	CM	CC
Philippe Cracchiole	DIV	576	60.56	19	2
Dominique Gervasoni	DIV	375	39.43	4	1
Valid votes		951	96.16		
White votes		22	2.22		
Rejected votes		16	1.62		
Total		989	100	23	3
Abstentions		1,252	55.87		
Registered voters - voter turnout		2,241	44.13		

=== Attignat ===
- Incumbent mayor: Walter Martin (DVD)
- 23 seats to be elected to the conseil municipal (population in 2017: 3,211 residents)
- 2 seats to be elected to the conseil communautaire (CA du Bassin de Bourg-en-Bresse)

2020 Attignat municipal election results
Leader	List	First round		Seats	
Leader	List	Votes	%	CM	CC
Walter Martin	DVD	777	100	23	2
Valid votes		777	91.52		
White votes		36	4.24		
Rejected votes		36	4.24		
Total		849	100	23	2
Abstentions		1,574	64.96		
Registered voters - voter turnout		2,423	35.04		

=== Bâgé-Dommartin ===
- Incumbent mayor: Dominique Repiquet (DVD)
- 29 seats to be elected to the conseil municipal (population in 2017: 4,092 residents)
- 5 seats to be elected to the conseil communautaire (CC Bresse et Saône)

2020 Bâgé-Dommartin municipal election results
Leader	List	First round		Seats	
Leader	List	Votes	%	CM	CC
Christian Bernigaud	DIV	661	100	29	5
Valid votes		661	92.58		
White votes		15	2.10		
Rejected votes		38	5.32		
Total		741	100	29	5
Abstentions		2,231	75.76		
Registered voters - voter turnout		2,945	24.24		

=== Béligneux ===
- Incumbent mayor: Francis Sigoire (DVD)
- 23 seats to be elected to the conseil municipal (population in 2017: 3,333 residents)
- 4 seats to be elected to the conseil communautaire (CC de la Côtière à Montluel)

2020 Béligneux municipal election results
Leader	List	First round		Seats	
Leader	List	Votes	%	CM	CC
Jacques Piot	DIV	424	52.86	18	3
Daniel Clément	DIV	378	47.13	5	1
Valid votes		802	96.51		
White votes		15	1.81		
Rejected votes		14	1.68		
Total		831	100	23	4
Abstentions		1,054	55.92		
Registered voters - voter turnout		1,885	44.08		

=== Belley ===
- Incumbent mayor: Pierre Berthet (DVD)
- 29 seats to be elected to the conseil municipal (population in 2017: 9,103 residents)
- 16 seats to be elected to the conseil communautaire (CC Bugey Sud)

2020 Belley municipal election results
Leader	List	First round		Second round		Seats	
Leader	List	Votes	%	Votes	%	CM	CC
Dimitri Lahuerta	LR	902	33.73	1,525	54.99	23	12
Jean-Marc Fognini	DIV	641	23.97	1,248	45.01	6	4
Philippe Rodriguez	DVG	415	15.51	1,248	45.01	6	4
Patrick Bardey	DVC	293	10.95	Withdrew		0	0
Pierre Berthet	DVD	288	10.77	Withdrew		0	0
Julien Quinard	LREM	135	5.04			0	0
Valid votes		2,674	95.64	2,773	96.28		
White votes		46	1.65	51	1.77		
Rejected votes		76	2.72	56	1.94		
Total		2,796	100	2,880	100	29	16
Abstentions		2,952	51.36	2,877	49.97		
Registered voters - voter turnout		5,748	48.64	5,757	50.03		

=== Bellignat ===
- Incumbent mayor: Jean-Georges Arbant (PS)
- 27 seats to be elected to the conseil municipal (population in 2017: 3,624 residents)
- 3 seats to be elected to the conseil communautaire (Haut-Bugey Agglomération)

2020 Bellignat municipal election results
Leader	List	First round		Seats	
Leader	List	Votes	%	CM	CC
Véronique Ravet	DVG	481	64.04	22	2
Christophe Armetta	DVD	270	35.95	5	1
Valid votes		751	96.28		
White votes		17	2.18		
Rejected votes		12	1.54		
Total		780	100	27	3
Abstentions		1,092	58.33		
Registered voters - voter turnout		1,872	41.67		

=== Beynost ===
- Incumbent mayor: Caroline Terrier (LR)
- 27 seats to be elected to the conseil municipal (population in 2017: 4,613 residents)
- 6 seats to be elected to the conseil communautaire (CC de Miribel et du Plateau)

2020 Beynost municipal election results
Leader	List	First round		Seats	
Leader	List	Votes	%	CM	CC
Caroline Terrier	LR	1,073	64.36	23	5
Cyril Langelot	LREM	594	35.63	4	1
Valid votes		1,667	97.37		
White votes		24	1.40		
Rejected votes		21	1.23		
Total		1,712	100	27	6
Abstentions		1,950	53.25		
Registered voters - voter turnout		3,662	46.75		

=== Bourg-en-Bresse ===
- Incumbent mayor: Jean-François Debat (PS)
- 43 seats to be elected to the conseil municipal (population in 2017: 41,527 residents)
- 31 seats to be elected to the conseil communautaire (CA du Bassin de Bourg-en-Bresse)

2020 Bourg-en-Bresse municipal election results
Leader	List	First round		Seats	
Leader	List	Votes	%	CM	CC
Jean-François Debat	PS	4,892	60.98	36	26
Aurane Reihanian	LR	1,654	20.61	4	3
Jérome Buisson	RN	701	8.73	2	1
Mickaël Ruiz	LREM	594	7.40	1	1
Sylvain Cousson	LO	181	2.25	0	0
Valid votes		8,022	97.85		
White votes		67	0.82		
Rejected votes		109	1.33		
Total		8,198	100	43	11
Abstentions		14,641	64.11		
Registered voters - voter turnout		22,839	35.89		

=== Cessy ===
- Incumbent mayor: Christophe Bouvier (DVD)
- 27 seats to be elected to the conseil municipal (population in 2017: 4,856 residents)
- 2 seats to be elected to the conseil communautaire (Pays de Gex Agglo)

2020 Cessy municipal election results
Leader	List	First round		Seats	
Leader	List	Votes	%	CM	CC
Christophe Bouvier	DVD	640	53.42	21	2
Thierry Nicod	DVC	558	46.57	6	0
Valid votes		1,198	98.44		
White votes		14	1.15		
Rejected votes		5	0.41		
Total		1,217	100	27	2
Abstentions		1,542	55.89		
Registered voters - voter turnout		2,749	44.11		

=== Ceyzériat ===
- Incumbent mayor: Jean-Yves Flochon (LR)
- 23 seats to be elected to the conseil municipal (population in 2017: 3,157 residents)
- 2 seats to be elected to the conseil communautaire (CA du Bassin de Bourg-en-Bresse)

2020 Ceyzériat municipal election
Leader	List	First round		Seats	
Leader	List	Votes	%	CM	CC
Jean-Yves Fluchon	LR	641	100	23	2
Valid votes		641	90.92		
White votes		24	3.40		
Rejected votes		40	5.67		
Total		705	100	23	2
Abstentions		1,606	69.49	c	
Registered voters - voter turnout		2,311	30.51	c	

=== Châtillon-sur-Chalaronne ===
- Incumbent mayor: Patrick Mathias (DVD)
- 27 seats to be elected to the conseil municipal (population in 2017: 4,859 residents)
- 7 seats to be elected to the conseil communautaire (CC de la Dombes)

2020 Châtillon-sur-Charlaronne municipal election
Leader	List	First round		Seats	
Leader	List	Votes	%	CM	CC
Patrick Mathias	DVD	893	57.46	22	6
Jean-François Jannet	DVG	661	42.35	5	1
Valid votes		1,554	98.35		
White votes		12	0.76		
Rejected votes		14	0.89		
Total		1,580	100	27	7
Abstentions		2,025	56.17		
Registered voters - voter turnout		3,605	43.38		

=== Culoz ===
- Incumbent mayor: Franck André-Masse (DVD)
- 23 seats to be elected to the conseil municipal (population in 2017: 3,035 residents)
- 5 seats to be elected to the conseil communautaire (CC Bugey Sud)

2020 Culoz municipal election
Leader	List	First round		Seats	
Leader	List	Votes	%	CM	CC
Franck André-Masse	DVD	633	76.54	21	5
Christelle Bouvier	DIV	194	23.45	2	0
Valid votes		827	97.52		
White votes		5	0.59		
Rejected votes		16	1.89		
Total		848	100	23	5
Abstentions		1,049	55.30		
Registered voters - voter turnout		1,897	44.70		

=== Dagneux ===
- Incumbent mayor: Bernard Simplex (DVD)
- 27 seats to be elected to the conseil municipal (population in 2017: 4,717 residents)
- 6 seats to be elected to the conseil communautaire (CC de la Côtière à Montluel)

2020 Dagneux municipal election
Leader	List	First round		Seats	
Leader	List	Votes	%	CM	CC
Carine Couturier	DVD	575	100	27	6
Valid votes		575	83.82		
White votes		60	8.75		
Rejected votes		51	7.43		
Total		686	100	27	6
Abstentions		2,541	78.74		
Registered voters - voter turnout		3,227	21.26		

=== Divonne-les-Baines ===
- Incumbent mayor: Vincent Scattolin (LR)
- 29 seats to be elected to the conseil municipal (population in 2017: 9,644 residents)
- 5 seats to be elected to the conseil communautaire (Pays de Gex Agglo)

2020 Divonne-les-Baines municipal election
Leader	List	First round		Seats	
Leader	List	Votes	%	CM	CC
Vincent Scattolin	LR	1,617	65.04	24	5
Jean Di Stefano	DVC	705	28.35	4	0
Jean-Louis Yguel	LREM	164	6.59	1	0
Valid votes		2,486	97.87		
White votes		18	0.71		
Rejected votes		36	1.42		
Total		2,540	100	29	5
Abstentions		3,726	59.46		
Registered voters - voter turnout		6,266	40.54		

=== Feillens ===
- Incumbent mayor: Guy Billoudet (LR)
- 23 seats to be elected to the conseil municipal (population in 2017: 3,291 residents)
- 4 seats to be elected to the conseil communautaire (CC Bresse et Saône)

2020 Feillens municipal election
Leader	List	First round		Seats	
Leader	List	Votes	%	CM	CC
Guy Billoudet	LR	732	64.43	19	3
Avec vous, Expérience et Jeunesse pour Feillens		732	64.43	19	3
Gilles Dumas	DIV	404	35.56	4	1
Feillens Nouvel Elan		404	35.56	4	1
Valid votes		1,136	97.09		
White votes		19	1.62		
Rejected votes		15	1.28		
Total		1,170	100	23	4
Abstentions		1,406	54.58		
Registered voters - voter turnout		2,576	45.42		

=== Ferney-Voltaire ===
- Incumbent mayor: Daniel Raphoz (UDI)
- 29 seats to be elected to the conseil municipal (population in 2017: 9,766 residents)
- 5 seats to be elected to the conseil communautaire (Pays de Gex Agglo)

2020 Ferney-Voltaire municipal election
Leader	List	First round		Second round		Seats	
Leader	List	Votes	%	Votes	%	CM	CC
Daniel Ruphoz	DVD	619	40.85	747	50.40	23	5
Ferney-Voltaire Valeurs Communes		619	40.85	747	50.40	23	5
Jean-Loup Kasler	DIV	291	19.20	369	24.89	3	0
Ferney en grand		291	19.20	369	24.89	3	0
François Meylan	DVG (1st round) DVC (2nd round)	317	20.92	366	24.69	3	0
Ferney Avenir 2020 (1st round) La Force de l'Union (2nd round)		317	20.92	366	24.69	3	0
Dorian Lacombe	LREM	155	10.23	366	24.69	3	0
Ferney-Voltaire: Tout pour plaire!		155	10.23	366	24.69	3	0
Christian Landreau	DIV	133	8.77	366	24.69	3	0
Ensemble pour Ferney		133	8.77	366	24.69	3	0
Valid votes		1,515	97.81	1,482	97.63		
White votes		13	0.84	22	1.45		
Rejected votes		21	1.36	14	0.92		
Total		1,549	100	1,518	100	29	5
Abstentions		2,242	59.14	2,280	60.03		
Registered voters - voter turnout		3,791	40.86	3,798	39.97		

=== Gex ===
- Incumbent mayor: Patrice Dunand (DVD)
- 33 seats to be elected to the conseil municipal (population in 2017: 13,118 residents)
- 7 seats to be elected to the conseil communautaire (Pays de Gex Agglo)

2020 Gex municipal election
Leader	List	First round		Seats	
Leader	List	Votes	%	CM	CC
Patrice Dunand	DVD	1,442	71.35	29	6
Gex Avenir 2020		1,442	71.35	29	6
Guy Juillard	LREM	579	28.64	4	1
Mieux Vivre à Gex		579	28.64	4	1
Valid votes		2,021	98.06		
White votes		23	1.12		
Rejected votes		17	0.82		
Total		2,061	100	33	7
Abstentions		4,440	68.30		
Registered voters - voter turnout		6,501	31.70		

=== Jassans-Riottier ===
- Incumbent mayor: Jean-Pierre Reverchon (SE)
- 29 seats to be elected to the conseil municipal (population in 2017: 6,339 residents)
- 5 seats to be elected to the conseil communautaire (CA Villefranche-Beaujolais-Saône)

2020 Jassans-Riottier municipal election
Leader	List	First round		Second round		Seats	
Leader	List	Votes	%	Votes	%	CM	CC
Jean-Pierre Reverchon	DVD	756	43.69	856	52.16	23	5
Jassans La Force d'Agir Essemble		756	43.69	856	52.16	23	5
Jean-François Colombier	DVD	432	24.97	415	25.28	4	0
Un nouvel élan pour Jassans		432	24.97	415	25.28	4	0
Sylvie Segura	DVC	286	16.53	204	12.43	1	0
Jassans C'est Vous - C'est Nous		286	16.53	204	12.43	1	0
Christian Andreo	DIV	236	14.79	166	10.11	1	0
Jassans Autrement		236	14.79	166	10.11	1	0
Valid votes		1,730	97.85	1,641	98.38		
White votes		19	1.07	17	1.02		
Rejected votes		19	1.07	10	0.60		
Total		1,768	100	1,668	100	29	5
Abstentions		2,586	59.39	2,689	61.72		
Registered voters - voter turnout		4,354	40.61	4,357	38.28		

=== La Boisse ===
- Incumbent mayor: François Drogue (DVD)
- 23 seats to be elected to the conseil municipal (population in 2017: 3,229 residents)
- 4 seats to be elected to the conseil communautaire (CC de la Côtière à Montluel)

2020 La Boisse municipal election
Leader	List	First round		Seats	
Leader	List	Votes	%	CM	CC
Gérard Raphanel	SE	615	57.90	18	3
Ensemble, gérons, préservons et dynamisons notre commune		615	57.90	18	3
Caroline Condé-Delphine	SE	447	42.09	5	1
La Boisse, sereine		447	42.09	5	1
Valid votes		1,062	97.97		
White votes		10	0.92		
Rejected votes		12	1.11		
Total		1,084	100	23	4
Abstentions		1,180	52.12		
Registered voters - voter turnout		2,264	47.88		

=== Lagnieu ===
- Incumbent mayor: André Moingeon (LR)
- 29 seats to be elected to the conseil municipal (population in 2017: 7,143 residents)
- 6 seats to be elected to the conseil communautaire (CC de la Plaine de l'Ain)

2020 Lagnieu municipal election
Leader	List	First round		Seats	
Leader	List	Votes	%	CM	CC
André Moingeon	DVD	1,737	67.27	25	5
Lagnieu en action.		1,737	67.27	25	5
Rémy Chabbouh	DVG	845	32.72	4	1
Lagnieu autrement.		845	32.72	4	1
Valid votes		2,582	98.36		
White votes		21	0.80		
Rejected votes		22	0.84		
Total		2,625	100	29	6
Abstentions		2,557	49.34		
Registered voters - voter turnout		5,182	50.66		

=== Loyettes ===
- Incumbent mayor: Jean-Pierre Gagne (DVD)
- 23 seats to be elected to the conseil municipal (population in 2017: 3,146 residents)
- 3 seats to be elected to the conseil communautaire (CC de la Plaine de l'Ain)

2020 Loyettes municipal election
Leader	List	First round		Seats	
Leader	List	Votes	%	CM	CC
Jean-Pierre Gagne	DVD	602	76.29	21	3
Ensemble Construisons L'Avenir		602	76.29	21	3
Anne-Marie Brunet	SE	187	23.70	2	0
Loyettes, ensemble, autrement		187	23.70	2	0
Valid votes		789	97.17		
White votes		4	0.49		
Rejected votes		19	2.34		
Total		812	100	23	3
Abstentions		1,254	60.70		
Registered voters - voter turnout		2,066	39.30		

=== Meximieux ===
- Incumbent mayor: Christian Bussy (LR)
- 29 seats to be elected to the conseil municipal (population in 2017: 7,743 residents)
- 7 seats to be elected to the conseil communautaire (CC de la Plaine de l'Ain)

2020 Meximieux municipal election
Leader	List	First round		Seats	
Leader	List	Votes	%	CM	CC
Jean-Luc Ramel	DVD	1,631	66.49	24	6
Mohammed El Maroudi	LREM	822	33.50	5	1
Valid votes		2,453	96.27		
White votes		35	1.37		
Rejected votes		60	2.35		
Total		2,548	100	29	7
Abstentions		2,788	52.25		
Registered voters - voter turnout		5,336	47,75		

=== Miribel ===
- Incumbent mayor: Sylvie Viricel (DVG)
- 29 seats to be elected to the conseil municipal (population in 2017: 9,963 residents)
- 13 seats to be elected to the conseil communautaire (CC de Miribel et du Plateau)

2020 Miribel municipal election
Leader	List	First round		Second round		Seats	
Leader	List	Votes	%	Votes	%	CM	CC
Jean-Pierre Gaitet	DVD	1,283	46.77	1,391	50.72	23	11
Miribel pour tous, Miribel à tous		1,283	46.77	1,391	50.72	23	11
Sylvie Viricel	DVG	962	35.07	1,038	37.85	5	2
Ma ville avance		962	35.07	1,038	37.85	5	2
Nathalie Descours	LREM	498	18.15	313	11.41	1	0
Oxygène 2020		498	18.15	313	11.41	1	0
Valid votes		2,743	97.79	2,742	98.53		
White votes		41	1.46	23	0.83		
Rejected votes		21	0.75	18	0.65		
Total		2,805	100	2,783	100	29	13
Abstentions		4,042	59.03	4,064	59.35		
Registered voters - voter turnout		6,847	40.97	6,847	40.65		

=== Montluel ===
- Incumbent mayor: Romain Daubié (DVD)
- 29 seats to be elected to the conseil municipal (population in 2017: 6,964 residents)
- 9 seats to be elected to the conseil communautaire (CC de la Côtière à Montluel)

2020 Montluel municipal election
Leader	List	First round		Seats	
Leader	List	Votes	%	CM	CC
Romain Daubie	DVD	1,450	75.17	26	8
Albane Colin	DVG	479	24.83	3	1
Total votes		1,929	97.33		
White votes		21	1.06		
Rejected votes		32	1.61		
Total		1,982	100	29	9
Abstentions		2,387	54.63		
Registered voters - voter turnout		4,369	43.37		

=== Montmerle-sur-Saône ===
- Incumbent mayor: Raphaël Lamure (DVD)
- 27 seats to be elected to the conseil municipal (population in 2017: 3,793 residents)
- 6 seats to be elected to the conseil communautaire (CC Val de Saône Centre)

2020 Montmerle-sur-Saône municipal election
Leader	List	First round		Seats	
Leader	List	Votes	%	CM	CC
Philippe Prost	DVD	779	62.12	22	5
Ensemble pour Montmerle		779	62.12	22	5
Mélanie Monchaux	DVD	475	37.87	5	1
L'Écho des Montmerlois		475	37.87	5	1
Total votes		1,254	97.21		
White votes		14	1.09		
Rejected votes		22	1.71		
Total		1,290	100	27	6
Abstentions		1,580	55.05		
Registered voters - voter turnout		2,870	44.95		

=== Montréal-la-Cluse ===
- Incumbent mayor: Patrick Dufour (DVD)
- 23 seats to be elected to the conseil municipal (population in 2017: 3,435 residents)
- 3 seats to be elected to the conseil communautaire (Haut-Bugey Agglomération)

2020 Montréal-la-Cluse municipal election
Leader	List	First round		Seats	
Leader	List	Votes	%	CM	CC
Patrick Dufour	DVD	572	100	23	3
Montréal-la-Cluse : Une Ville en action		572	100	23	3
Total votes		572	89.80		
White votes		28	4.40		
Rejected votes		37	5.81		
Total		637	100	23	3
Abstentions		1,402	68.76		
Registered voters - voter turnout		2,039	31.24		

=== Nantua ===
- Incumbent mayor: Jean-Pierre Carminati (DVD)
- 23 seats to be elected to the conseil municipal (population in 2017: 3,446 residents)
- 3 seats to be elected to the conseil communautaire (Haut-Bugey Agglomération)

2020 Nantua municipal election
Leader	List	First round		Seats	
Leader	List	Votes	%	CM	CC
Jean-Pascal Thomasset	DVD	584	74.87	20	3
Ensemble continuons. Pour Nantua, pour notre ville.		584	74.87	20	3
Bertrand Bonnamour	DVD	196	25.12	3	0
Nantua au cœur		196	25.12	3	0
Total votes		780	96.30		
White votes		16	1.98		
Rejected votes		14	1.73		
Total		810	100	23	3
Abstentions		734	47.54		
Registered voters - voter turnout		1,544	52.46		

=== Ornex ===
- Incumbent mayor: Jean-François Obez (DVD)
- 27 seats to be elected to the conseil municipal (population in 2017: 4,410 residents)
- 2 seats to be elected to the conseil communautaire (Pays de Gex Agglo)

2020 Ornex municipal election
Leader	List	First round		Seats	
Leader	List	Votes	%	CM	CC
Jean-François Obez	DVD	430	54.29	21	2
Ornex Demain		430	54.29	21	2
Ghizlane Masrari	DVC	362	45.70	6	0
Ornex Ensemble		362	45.70	6	0
Total votes		792	96.23		
White votes		21	2.55		
Rejected votes		10	1.22		
Total		823	100	27	2
Abstentions		1,138	58.03		
Registered voters - voter turnout		1,961	41.97		

=== Oyonnax ===
- Incumbent mayor: Michel Perraud (UDI)
- 35 seats to be elected to the conseil municipal (population in 2017: 22,427 residents)
- 24 seats to be elected to the conseil communautaire (Haut-Bugey Agglomération)

2020 Oyonnax municipal election
Leader	List	First round		Seats	
Leader	List	Votes	%	CM	CC
Michel Perraud	DVD	2,380	52.06	27	18
Continuons à grandir ensemble		2,380	52.06	27	18
Julien Martinez	DVD	1,703	37.25	6	5
L'avenir est oyonnaxien		1,703	37.25	6	5
Pascal Baudet	UG	488	10.67	2	1
Oyonnax en commun		488	10.67	2	1
Total votes		4,571	98.03		
White votes		20	0.43		
Rejected votes		72	1.54		
Total		4,663	100	35	24
Abstentions		7,009	60.05		
Registered voters - voter turnout		11,672	39.95		

=== Péronnas ===
- Incumbent mayor: Christian Chanel (DVD)
- 29 seats to be elected to the conseil municipal (population in 2017: 6,385 residents)
- 4 seats to be elected to the conseil communautaire (CA du Bassin de Bourg-en-Bresse)

2020 Péronnas municipal election
Leader	List	First round		Seats	
Leader	List	Votes	%	CM	CC
Hélène Cedileau	DVD	1,235	67.89	25	4
Tous ensemble pour l'avenir de Péronnas		1,235	67.89	25	4
Pascal Fayard	DVG	584	32.10	4	0
Osez Péronnas 2020 - Avec Vous		584	32.10	4	0
Total votes		1,819	97.95		
White votes		10	0.54		
Rejected votes		28	1.51		
Total		1,857	100	29	4
Abstentions		2,720	59.43		
Registered voters - voter turnout		4,577	40.57		

=== Plateau d'Hauteville ===
- Incumbent mayor: Philippe Emin (LR)
- 29 seats to be elected to the conseil municipal (population in 2017: 4,853 residents)
- 5 seats to be elected to the conseil communautaire (Haut-Bugey Agglomération)

2020 Plateau d'Hauteville municipal election
Leader	List	First round		Seats	
Leader	List	Votes	%	CM	CC
Philippe Emin	DVD	878	53.93	23	4
Plateau d'Hauteville - Unis pour réussir		878	53.93	23	4
Joël Borgeot	DVG	750	46.06	6	1
Décidons ensemble pour vivre mieux		750	46.06	6	1
Total votes		1,628	94.49		
White votes		40	2.32		
Rejected votes		55	3.19		
Total		1,723	100	29	5
Abstentions		1,376	44.40		
Registered voters - voter turnout		3,099	55.60		

=== Prévessin-Moëns ===
- Incumbent mayor: Aurélie Charillon (DVD)
- 29 seats to be elected to the conseil municipal (population in 2017: 8,233 residents)
- 4 seats to be elected to the conseil communautaire (Pays de Gex Agglo)

2020 Prévessin-Moëns municipal election
Leader	List	First round		Seats	
Leader	List	Votes	%	CM	CC
Aurélie Charillon	DVD	874	57.34	23	3
Catherine Laverrière	DVG	650	42.65	6	1
Total votes		1,524	97.63		
White votes		21	1.35		
Rejected votes		16	1.02		
Total		1,561	100	29	4
Abstentions		2,551	62.04		
Registered voters - voter turnout		4,112	37.96		

=== Replonges ===
- Incumbent mayor: Bertrand Vernoux (LR)
- 27 seats to be elected to the conseil municipal (population in 2017: 3,717 residents)
- 5 seats to be elected to the conseil communautaire (CC Bresse et Saône)

2020 Replonges municipal election
Leader	List	First round		Seats	
Leader	List	Votes	%	CM	CC
Bertrand Vernoux	DVD	750	100	27	5
Replonges pour tous		750	100	27	5
Total votes		750	92.02		
White votes		23	2.82		
Rejected votes		42	5.15		
Total		815	100	27	5
Abstentions		1,947	70.49		
Registered voters - voter turnout		2,762	29.51		

=== Reyrieux ===
- Incumbent mayor: Jacky Dutruc (DVG)
- 27 seats to be elected to the conseil municipal (population in 2017: 4,797 residents)
- 5 seats to be elected to the conseil communautaire (CC Dombes-Saône Vallée)

2020 Reyrieux municipal elections
Leader	List	First round		Seats	
Leader	List	Votes	%	CM	CC
Carole Bontemps-Hesdin	DIV	917	54.68	21	4
Pour un nouveau visage de Reyrieux avec vous		917	54.68	21	4
Cécile Baudoux	DVC	522	31.12	4	1
Reyrieux Village d'avenir		522	31.12	4	1
Marie-Chantal Pesery	ECO	238	14.19	2	0
Reyrieux l'esprit vert		238	14.19	2	0
Total votes		1,677	98.07		
White votes		13	0.76		
Rejected votes		20	1.17		
Total		1,710	100	27	5
Abstentions		1,853	52.01		
Registered voters - voter turnout		3,563	47.99		

=== Saint-André-de-Corcy ===
- Incumbent mayor: Jean-Pierre Baron (LR)
- 23 seats to be elected to the conseil municipal (population in 2017: 3,354 residents)
- 4 seats to be elected to the conseil communautaire (CC de la Dombes)

2020 Saint-André-de-Corcy municipal election
Leader	List	First round		Seats	
Leader	List	Votes	%	CM	CC
Ludovic Loreau	SE	647	56.45	18	3
Ici et maintenant.		647	56.45	18	3
Monique Lacroix	SE	499	43.54	5	1
Saint André de Corcy Horizon 2026		499	43.54	5	1
Total votes		1,146	97.61		
White votes		6	0.51		
Rejected votes		22	1.87		
Total		1,174	100	23	4
Abstentions		1,422	54.78		
Registered voters - voter turnout		2,596	45.22		

=== Saint-Denis-lès-Bourg ===
- Incumbent mayor: Guillaume Fauvet (DVG)
- 29 seats to be elected to the conseil municipal (population in 2017: 5,747 residents)
- 4 seats to be elected to the conseil communautaire (CA du Bassin de Bourg-en-Bresse)

2020 Saint-Denis-lès-Bourg municipal election
Leader	List	First round		Seats	
Leader	List	Votes	%	CM	CC
Guillaume Fauvet	DVG	1,195	100	29	4
Saint Denis ensemble.		1,195	100	29	4
Valid votes		1,195	91.85		
White votes		35	2.69		
Rejected votes		71	5.46		
Total		1,301	100	29	4
Abstentions		3,278	71.59		
Registered voters - voter turnout		4,579	28.41		

=== Saint-Genis-Pouilly ===
- Incumbent mayor: Hubert Bertrand (PRG)
- 33 seats to be elected to the conseil municipal (population in 2017: 12,544 residents)
- 6 seats to be elected to the conseil communautaire (Pays de Gex Agglo)

2020 Saint-Genis-Pouilly municipal election
Leader	List	First round		Second round		Seats	
Leader	List	Votes	%	Votes	%	CM	CC
Hubert Bertrand	DVG	859	47.06	867	46.11	25	5
Saint-Genis-Pouilly, c'est vous		859	47.06	867	46.11	25	5
Michelle Chenu-Durafour	DVD	559	30.63	734	39.04	6	1
Agir ensemble		559	30.63	734	39.04	6	1
Anne-Sophie Marchand	ECO	407	22.30	279	14.84	2	0
Saint Genis à cœur		407	22.30	279	14.84	2	0
Valid votes		1,825	97.65	1,880	98.58		
White votes		16	0.86	12	0.63		
Rejected votes		28	1.50	15	0.79		
Total		1,869	100	1,907	100	33	6
Abstentions		3,140	62.69	3,108	61.97		
Registered voters - voter turnout		5,009	37.31	5,015	38.03		

=== Saint-Maurice-de-Beynost ===
- Incumbent mayor: Pierre Goubet (DVG)
- 27 seats to be elected to the conseil municipal (population in 2017: 3,967 residents)
- 5 seats to be elected to the conseil communautaire (CC de Miribel et du Plateau)

2020 Saint-Maurice-de-Beynost municipal election
Leader	List	First round		Seats	
Leader	List	Votes	%	CM	CC
Pierre Goubet	DVG	571	100	27	5
Total votes		571	90.21		
White votes		36	5.69		
Rejected votes		26	4.11		
Total		633	100	27	5
Abstentions		1,756	73.50		
Registered voters - voter turnout		2,389	36.50		

=== Thoiry ===
- Incumbent mayor: Muriel Bénier (DVD)
- 29 seats to be elected to the conseil municipal (population in 2017: 6,038 residents)
- 3 seats to be elected to the conseil communautaire (Pays de Gex Agglo)

2020 Thoiry municipal election
Leader	List	First round		Seats	
Leader	List	Votes	%	CM	CC
Muriel Bénier	DVD	1,045	72.16	25	3
Thoiry Pays de Gex		1,045	72.16	25	3
Yaēl Yavanovitch	LREM	403	27.83	4	0
Réenchantons Thoiry		403	27.83	4	0
Total votes		1,448	98.44		
White votes		16	1.09		
Rejected votes		7	0.48		
Total		1,471	100	29	3
Abstentions		1,824	55.36		
Registered voters - voter turnout		3,295	44.64		

=== Trévoux ===
- Incumbent mayor: Marc Péchoux (LR)
- 29 seats to be elected to the conseil municipal (population in 2017: 6,845 residents)
- 8 seats to be elected to the conseil communautaire (CC Dombes-Saône Vallée)

2020 Trévoux municipal election
Leader	List	First round		Seats	
Leader	List	Votes	%	CM	CC
Marc Péchoux	DVD	1,040	53.25	22	6
J'aime Trévoux		1,040	53.25	22	6
Patrick Charrondiere	DVG	913	46.74	7	2
Citoyens pour Trévoux		913	46.74	7	2
Total votes		1,953	98.24		
White votes		13	0.65		
Rejected votes		22	1.11		
Total		1,988	100	29	8
Abstentions		2,305	53.69		
Registered voters - voter turnout		4,293	46.31		

=== Valserhône ===
- Incumbent mayor: Régis Petit (DVD)
- 35 seats to be elected to the conseil municipal (population in 2017: 16,423 residents)
- 18 seats to be elected to the conseil communautaire (CC du Pays Bellegardien)

2020 Valserhône municipal election
Leader	List	First round		Seats	
Leader	List	Votes	%	CM	CC
Régis Petit	DVD	2,018	63.47	29	15
Valserhône, un défi, une ambition commune		2,018	63.47	29	15
Myriam Bouvet Multon	DVC	1,161	36.52	6	3
Valserhône avec vous, une passerelle vers l'avenir		1,161	36.52	6	3
Total votes		3,179	94.87		
White votes		84	2.51		
Rejected votes		88	2.63		
Total		3,351	100	35	18
Abstentions		5,842	63.55		
Registered voters - voter turnout		9,193	36.45		

=== Villars-les-Dombes ===
- Incumbent mayor: Pierre Larrieu (DVD)
- 27 seats to be elected to the conseil municipal (population in 2017: 4,795 residents)
- 7 seats to be elected to the conseil communautaire (CC de la Dombes)

2020 Villars-les-Dombes municipal election
Leader	List	First round		Seats	
Leader	List	Votes	%	CM	CC
Pierre Larrieu	DVD	976	66.98	23	6
Villars en action		976	66.98	23	6
Jacques Lienhardt	DVG	481	33.01	4	1
Villars 2020, Une ambition collective		481	33.01	4	1
Total votes		1,457	97.59		
White votes		19	1.27		
Rejected votes		17	1.14		
Total		1,493	100	27	7
Abstentions		1,810	54.80		
Registered voters - voter turnout		3,303	45.20		

=== Villieu-Loyes-Mollon ===
- Incumbent mayor: Éric Beaufort (DVD)
- 27 seats to be elected to the conseil municipal (population in 2017: 3,653 residents)
- 3 seats to be elected to the conseil communautaire (CC de la Plaine de l'Ain)

2020 Villieu-Loyes-Mollon municipal election
Leader	List	First round		Seats	
Leader	List	Votes	%	CM	CC
Éric Beaufort	DVD	493	100	27	3
Ensemble pour un avenir durable		493	100	27	3
Valid votes		493	78.88		
White votes		65	10.40		
Rejected votes		67	10.72		
Total		625	100	27	3
Abstentions		2,093	77.01		
Registered voters - voter turnout		2,718	22.99		

=== Viriat ===
- Incumbent mayor: Bernard Perret (DVD)
- 29 seats to be elected to the conseil municipal (population in 2017: 6,418 residents)
- 4 seats to be elected to the conseil communautaire (CA du Bassin de Bourg-en-Bresse)

2020 Viriat municipal election
Leader	List	First round		Seats	
Leader	List	Votes	%	CM	CC
Bernard Perret	DVD	1,351	100	29	4
Viriat pour tous		1,351	100	29	4
Valid votes		1,351	89.12		
White votes		86	5.67		
Rejected votes		79	5.21		
Total		1,516	100	29	4
Abstentions		3,184	67.74		
Registered voters - voter turnout		4,700	32.26		

== Communes without candidates ==
In three communes, Buellas, Péron and Point d'Ain no candidates stood for election.

== See also ==
- 2020 French municipal elections
  - 2020 Allier municipal elections
  - 2020 Bas-Rhin municipal elections
  - 2020 Caen municipal election
  - 2020 Paris municipal election
