= Bâgé =

Bâgé may refer to several communes in France:

- Bâgé-Dommartin, in the Ain department
- Bâgé-la-Ville, in the Ain department
- Bâgé-le-Châtel, in the Ain department
