= Louis Duret =

French physician

Louis Duret (1527 – 22 January 1586) was a French physician to Charles IX of France and his brother Henry III of France as their chief physician.

== Early life ==
Duret was born in Bâgé-la-Ville in the French province of Bresse (which then belonged to the Duke of Savoy) in the year 1527. He came from a minor French nobility family. Leaving his father's home as a teenager. he made little money and subsisted at the poverty level. Around age nineteen, Duret decided to go to Paris to seek a good career. At first he was trained in academic disciplines by a private tutor, French magistrate Achilles Harlay, who took him under his wing because he demonstrated talent in many academic fields, especially the languages of Latin, Greek, and Arabic, which were integral to medicine. Duret had a photographic memory and knew all the works of Hippocrates by heart.

== Adult ==
Duret studied medicine under the training of Jacques Houllier and Jacques Dubois. He studied the medicine field with much vigor with his skills of the languages he knew, which proved helpful in his new career of medicine. He soon occupied a position at the Collège de France. His excellent reputation spread rapidly. He became a professor and ultimately taught at this college, a position he held for eighteen years (1568–1586).

Philosophically, he was firmly attached to Hippocrates and the Hippocratic oath, with roots in ancient medical practice. So esteemed was he that Henry III granted him a pension of "four hundred crowns of gold."

== Family genealogy ==
Duret's father was Jean Duret. He had a son, Charles Duret, that was superintendent of finance. He also had another son, Jean Duret (1563–1629), who was physician to Queen Marie de Medici. When Duret's daughter Catherine Arnoult de Lisle married in 1586, King Henry III attended the wedding and gave her a lucrative financial endowment, honoring Duret's services as a medical doctor.

== Surname ==
Sometimes in Old French the source says the spelling of his surname is "Duket".

== Death ==
Duret died in Paris on 22 January 1586.

== Works ==
- Adversaria, enarrationes et scholia in Jac. Hollerii opera practica, et scholia in ejusdem librum de morbis internis, Paris, 1571.

== Legacy ==
His most famous work is the unpublished commentary on Hippocrates in 1588.

- Hippocratis magni Coacæ prœnotiones; opus admirabile in tres libros distributum, interprete et enarratore L. Dureto Segusiano.

His son Jean Duret finished the work and published it in 1631 as:

- In magni Hippocratis librum de humoribus purgandis et in libros tres diæta acutorum, L. Dureti Segisiani commentarii interpretatione et enarratione insignes, Paris, J. Jost, 1631 (comments dictated in 1565 – 1566).

== Bibliography ==
- Chalmers, Alexander (1813). Louis Duret (1527–1629). Vol. 12. London: Nichols, Son & Bentley. pp. 517–518. ISBN 9780404014902. ; at Google books.
- Michaud, Louis Gabriel; Michaud, Joseph Fr. (1814). Biographie universelle, ancienne et moderne.
- Thomas, Joseph (1 January 2010). The Universal Dictionary of Biography and Mythology, Clu-hys. Cosimo, Inc. ISBN 978-1-61640-071-2.
