= Jean-Antoine Morand =

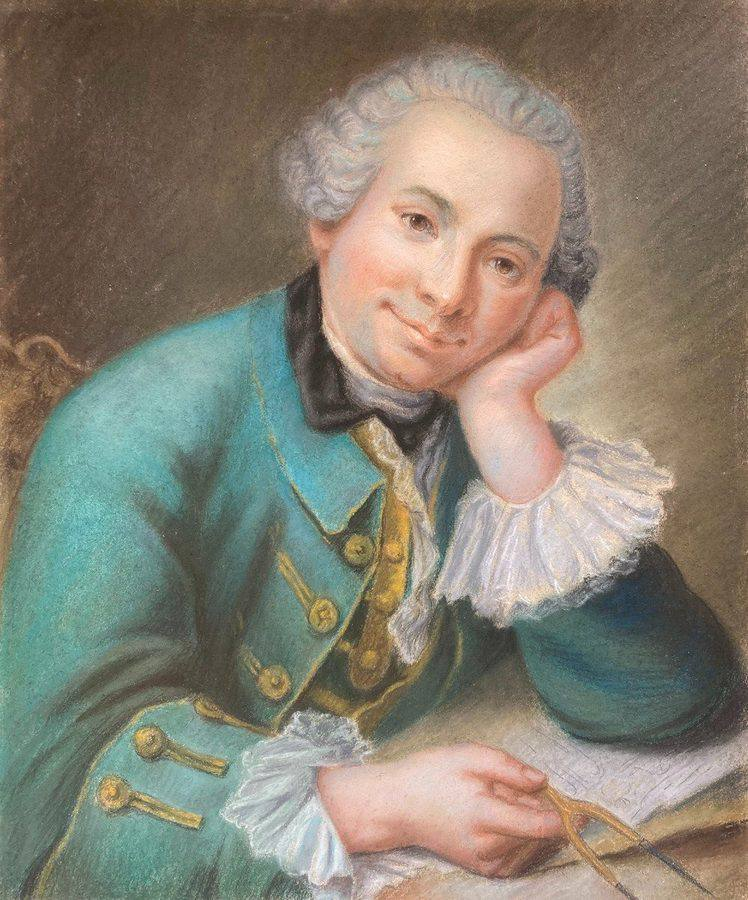
- Portrait of Jean-Antoine Morand by Joseph-Marie Vien (circa 1765–1770)
- Born: November 10, 1727; Briançon, France
- Died: January 24, 1794; Lyon, France
- Education: Jacques-Germain Soufflot
- Occupations: Architect; Painter; Urban planner

Jean-Antoine Morand (born in Briançon on November 10, 1727; died in Lyon on January 24, 1794) was an artist, engineer, architect, urban planner, and real estate promoter. He came to Lyon at a young age and studied in Paris and Rome. He is best known for his general plan for the embellishment of Lyon, the circular expansion of the Brotteaux district, and the construction of the wooden bridge over the Rhône that bears his name. He was guillotined for having taken part in the defense of the city during the Siege of Lyon by the troops of the National Convention.

== Painter and decorator ==
Born in Briançon on November 10, 1727, Jean-Antoine Morand came from an old famille de robe originally from La Vallouise. He was the son of Étienne Morand, a lawyer at the bailiwick and First Consul of the city, and Éléonore Peralda. He is said to have run away at the age of fourteen to escape an ecclesiastical career and pursue an artistic vocation.

In 1744, he was found in Lyon where he collaborated on the decoration of two festivals "staged" by Étienne Montagnon, ordinary painter and architect of the Chapter of Saint-Jean from 1725 to 1758, who died in 1762, undoubtedly his first master.

From 1748, Morand created his own workshop specializing in interior decoration work in trompe-l'œil, mainly for private individuals. On various occasions, he designed and executed ephemeral architectures. In 1753, he distinguished himself by decorating the Concert Hall and, the following year, the Chapel of the Visitation of Notre-Dame, also known as the artisans' chapel, or the affaneurs, within the Collège de la Trinité, now the collège-lycée Ampère. Approached by Soufflot to produce the sets and machinery for the new theater in Lyon, Morand perfected his skills in Paris under Servandoni.

Following the success of the Lyon theater, Morand's reputation crossed borders. He was officially summoned to the Duchy of Parma by Guillaume Du Tillot, the Minister of State, who entrusted him with the decoration of the Ducal Theater for the royal wedding of Infanta Isabella of Parma to Archduke Joseph of Austria, the future Holy Roman Emperor. Morand took the opportunity to visit Italy, and in particular Rome, an essential step in building the image of an artist. Although his career shifted towards architecture, Morand remained active in the fields of decorative painting and scenography.

== Architect and urban planner ==
From 1757, Morand was part of a group of investors, brought together by Soufflot, for the development of the new Saint-Clair district, gained on an island in the Rhône, north of the Terreaux. He bought three plots on which he erected three buildings himself, thus making his first architectural efforts.

Aware of the need to expand the city beyond the Rhône, Morand thought from the early 1760s about various projects for Les Brotteaux on the left bank of the Rhône. In 1764, he proposed to the Hôtel-Dieu de Lyon a plan for a large park laid out on its vast properties. When this plan was rejected, Morand purchased an enclosed plot of land within the Hôtel-Dieu's vast possessions the following year. This provoked a lengthy and bitter legal battle with the powerful hospital, which sought to protect the rental income of its poor tenants from Morand's urban development. Undeterred, the architect immediately published a subdivision project for the area, which became known as the "Pré Morand" (Morand Meadow). In 1766, he presented to the Consulate of the city his Projet d’un plan général de la ville de Lyon (Project for a general plan of the city of Lyon), or "Circular Plan", a rival to the Perrache project at the Confluence, but significantly more ambitious. This plan was the subject of an engraved plate in 1775 that remained relatively famous.

The creation of a new, vast, and regular district on the left bank of the Rhône was intended to provide spaces for walking and relaxation, but also warehouses for industry. The goal was to enlarge the city, correcting most of its defects (narrow and irregular streets, obstructions of bridges, quays, and squares, lack of hygiene, lack of space, air, and light). The whole was inscribed within a circular enclosure supposed to remove any urban difficulty through the very perfection of its form (superficial influence of the "ideal cities" of classical urbanism).

The construction of a bridge over the Rhône between the Terreaux and the Brotteaux was decided with the agreement of the city in 1767 and that of the King's Council in 1771. Built between 1771 and 1775, the wooden bridge designed by Morand was inaugurated with a 99-year privilege (the current Pont Morand is the third structure at this location). In 1772, a company was created to operate the bridge, acquiring the cession of all ferries and cable ferries crossing the Rhône between Saint-Clair and the Pont de la Guillotière. After disagreements with the Hospices civils de Lyon, the company obtained the toll concession. The venture was advantageous for both the owners and the citizens, as the toll was one-third cheaper than the previous ferries, and the bridge was exempt from taxes. Following the bridge's construction, the left bank of the Rhône at the Brotteaux developed into a leisure space composed of guinguettes (taverns) and promenades planted with elms. However, despite some constructions and aborted projects, the Brotteaux remained, when the Revolution broke out, primarily a place for walking and leisure.

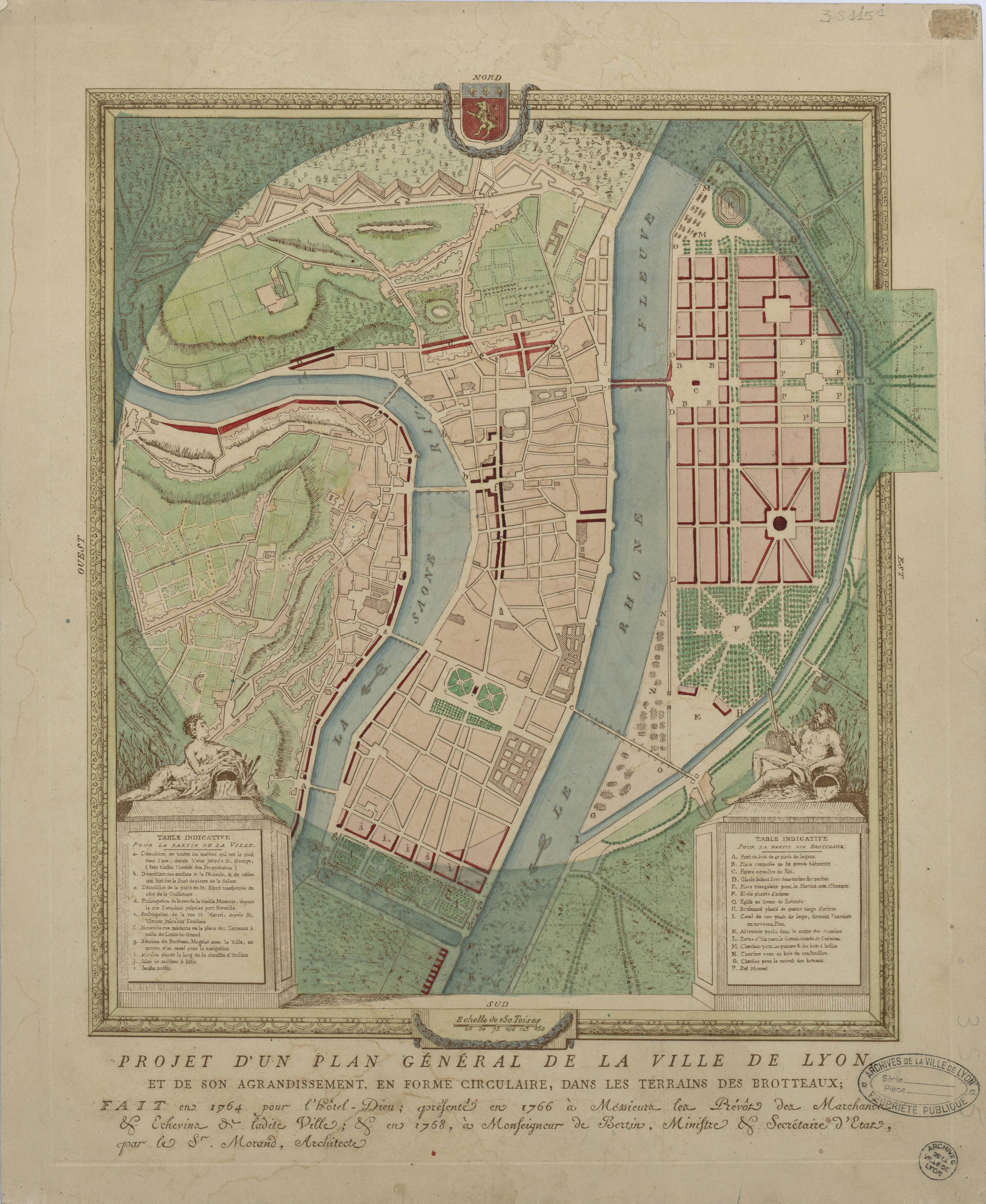
Project for a general plan of the City of Lyon and its expansion, in the Brotteaux terrains by Morand (1764)

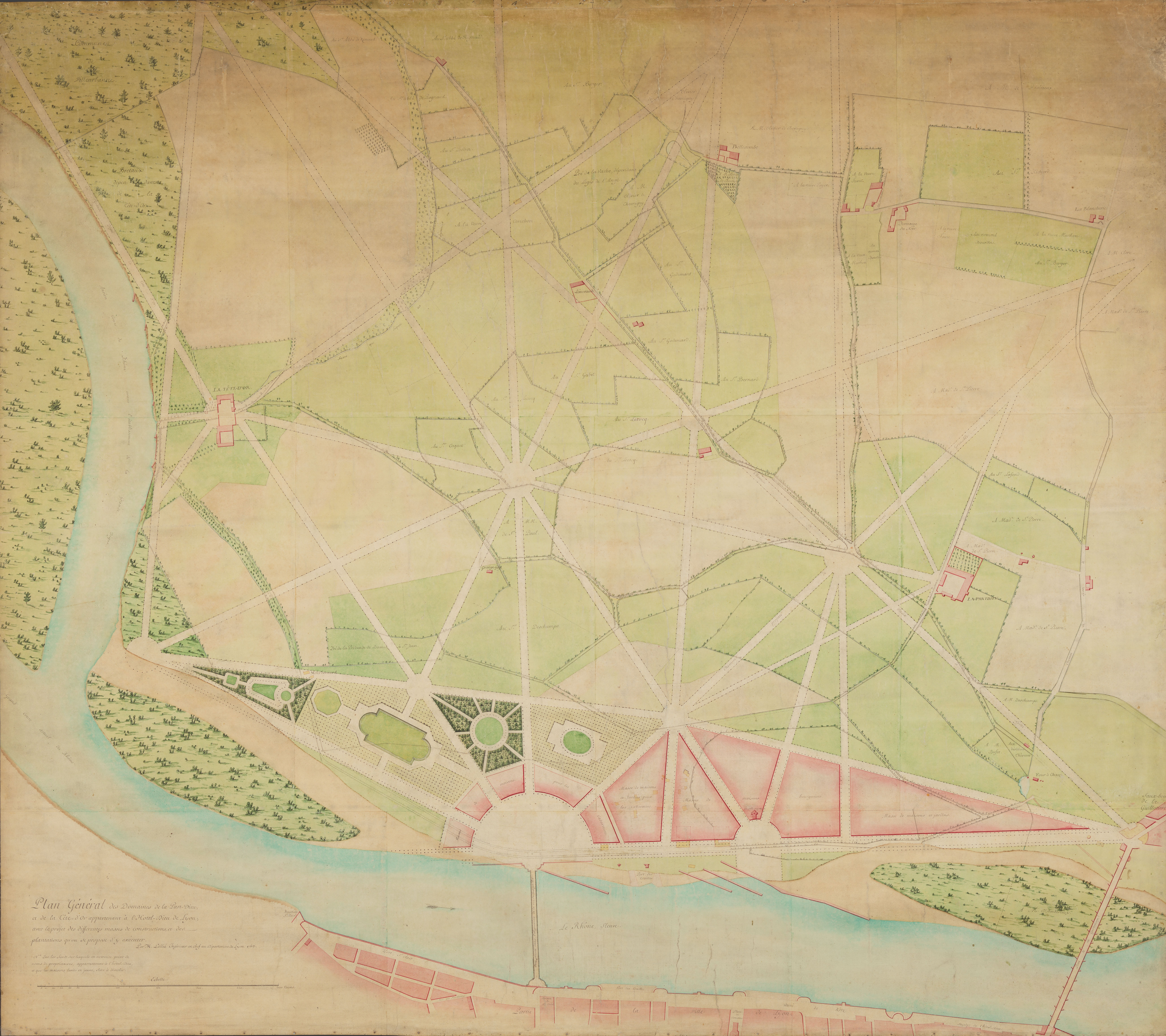
Development plan of the Brotteaux by the Hôtel-Dieu de Lyon (1763), competing with Morand's

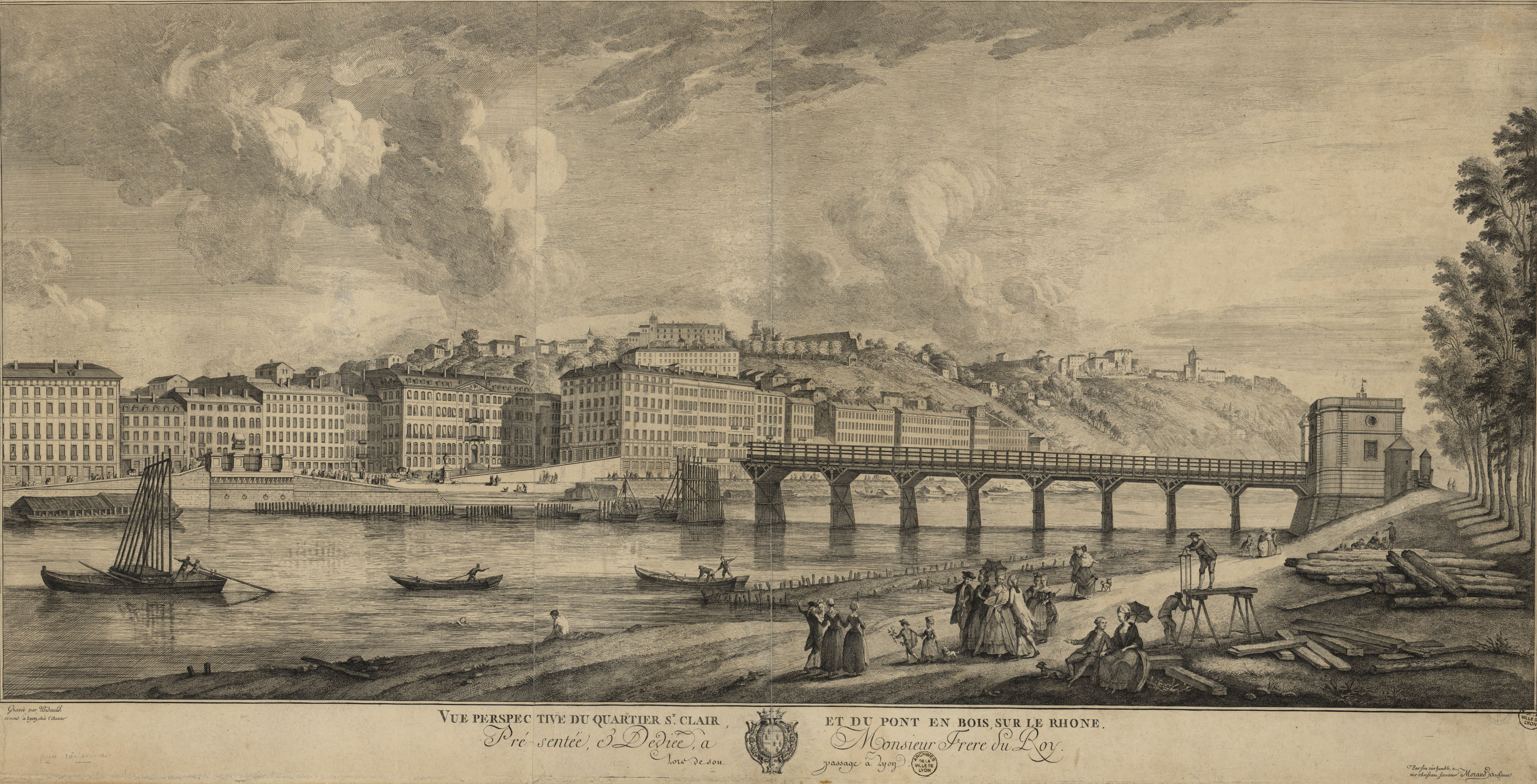
Perspective view of the construction of the Saint-Clair bridge engraved by Jean-Pierre-Xavier Bidault after a drawing by Jean-Antoine Morand (1775)

== Career trajectory ==
Trained as a painter, primarily recognized for his ingenuity in the field of trompe-l'œil and machinery, a true engineer who threw a bridge over the Rhône and proposed a hydraulic machine project to supply the fountains of the Château de Versailles park, Morand was an architect (claiming to be one) who built little. Only the three buildings of the Saint-Clair district, the small prefecture hotel in Roanne, and a few walls of his house on Place Kléber (Restaurant Orsi) currently survive. As an artist and promoter, he may have suffered from an ambiguous status.

Regarding the Brotteaux, the combination of a private project (subdivision of the pré Morand, construction and operation of the bridge) and a general plan oriented towards the public good cast doubt on Morand's intentions, accused by his detractors of wanting to enrich himself at the expense of the public, and in particular the poor, whose interests the Hôtel-Dieu was supposed to represent.

This ambiguity moreover marked Morand's entire career, a private entrepreneur desiring public recognition, particularly in the form of official positions. The function of voyer and ordinary architect of the City eluded him, but in November 1777, Morand obtained the position of architect of the Chapter of the primatial church of Saint-Jean, whose canons held the title of Counts of Lyon. Between 1780 and 1783, Morand was officially a voyer inspector in the jurisdiction of the Cloister (the cathedral district) and the Comté, which allowed him to intervene as an urban planner on the scale of a district of the city. Finally, seeking the patronage of the aristocracy (he worked from the 1770s on several châteaus, including the Château de Montribloud), Morand—already of noble extraction through his father's status—sought formal royal recognition for his artistic merits. He was admitted to the Order of Saint Michael, receiving the rank of chevalier.

The Siege of Lyon in the summer of 1793 brought the Morand family close to ruin. The Brotteaux district was devastated, with trees and buildings burned or destroyed. Morand's bridge, half-destroyed and unusable, suffered heavy fire from Jacobin assaults, though it remained the only means for the besieged to communicate with the road to Italy and bring in vital supplies. Morand chose to partially dismantle the bridge he had built rather than let the Royalist defenders destroy it entirely to block the advancing Convention troops. He was arrested in November 1793, accused of having sabotaged his own bridge to slow the arrival of Republican troops. He was first imprisoned at the maison de sûreté dite des Recluses, before being transferred to the hôtel commun (the current site of Lyon's City Hall). He underwent a first interrogation on December 23, which he transcribed and sent to his wife, Antoinette. Brought before a revolutionary commission, Morand attempted to save himself by denying royalist convictions and vaunting his attachment to the public good. He was nevertheless condemned and perished in Lyon on January 24, 1794. His true loyalties were revealed on his way to the scaffold: according to family tradition, he expressed his regrets at not having been led to the guillotine on January 21, the anniversary of the death of his beloved King..

== Personal life and archives ==
In January 1759, Morand married Antoinette Levet. The couple had two children: Antoine, born in 1760, and Éléonore, born in 1762. Morand's descendants preserved his extensive family papers, known as the Fonds Morand de Jouffrey, which are now held by the Lyon Municipal Archives. This collection, which includes architectural drawings, urban planning projects, and intimate family correspondence—such as letters detailing his imprisonment and interrogation—has been a valuable resource for historians studying family life during the French Revolution and the First French Empire.

In 2017, a commemorative plaque honoring Morand was placed on Place Kléber in Lyon, marking the 150th anniversary of the creation of the 6th arrondissement.

== Portraits ==
- Pierre Bernard. Bernard. Portrait of Jean-Antoine Morand (1764). Pastel. Private coll. (see photo: Lyon Municipal Archives, 5 PH 8247).
- Joseph Chinard. Bust of Jean-Antoine Morand (c. 1789). Terracotta. Private coll. (see photo: Lyon Municipal Archives, 5 PH 8249).
- Joseph Chinard (school of). Bust of Jean-Antoine Morand (c. 1810). Plaster. Musée de Grenoble coll. (MG 384).
- Couturier and Quenedey. Posthumous portrait of Jean-Antoine Morand (c. 1810). Engraving.
- Louis Thomassin. Posthumous portrait of Jean-Antoine Morand (c. 1810). Black chalk and stump on vellum paper. Private coll.
- Aurélie Moreau. The bust of Morand (2006) is located in the underground parking lot, Place Maréchal-Lyautey (Lyon 6th arr.).

== Bibliography ==
- Bertin (Dominique) et Mathian (Nathalie). Lyon. Silhouettes d’une ville recomposée. Architecture et urbanisme 1789-1914. Lyon: Éditions lyonnaises d’Art et d’Histoire, s.d.
- Barre (Josette), Feuga (Paul). Morand et les Brotteaux. Lyon: Éditions Lyonnaises d’Art et d’Histoire, 1998. 128 p. (Coll. Vues de quartiers.)
- Dagier (Etienne). Histoire chronologique de l’hôpital général et grand hôtel-dieu de Lyon. Lyon, 1830.
- Chuzeville (Sylvain). "Les débuts de Victor Louis vus par Jean-Antoine Morand, peintre et architecte lyonnais (1727-1794)". In Victor Louis et son temps [colloquium, 2000, Paris]. Studies assembled by Christian Taillard. Bordeaux: université Michel de Montaigne, Bordeaux 3, 2004. pp. 91-100;
- Chuzeville (Sylvain). "L'architecte Victor Louis (1731-1800) et Lyon : un dessin inédit du fonds Morand de Jouffrey aux Archives municipales de Lyon". Histoire de l’Art, 2000, no. 47 [Personnalités et institutions], pp. 123-126.
- Chuzeville (Sylvain). "Promotion et postérité ; le rôle de la gravure dans la carrière de Jean-Antoine Morand, peintre et architecte à Lyon au XVIIIe century". In: Delineavit et sculpsit. 19 contributions on drawing-engraving relationships from the 16th to the 20th century. Mélanges offered to Marie-Félicie Perez-Pivot. pp. 105-112.
- Chuzeville (Sylvain). "Publication et publicité ; autour du Projet d’un plan général de la ville de Lyon de Jean-Antoine Morand". In: Claude-Nicolas Ledoux et le livre d’architecture en français [colloquium, 2004, Paris]. Directed by Daniel Rabreau. Paris: Monum, 2006.
- Chuzeville (Sylvain). Vie, œuvre et carrière de Jean-Antoine Morand, peintre et architecte à Lyon au XVIIIe century. Doctoral thesis: université Lumière-Lyon 2, 2012. 1 vol. (500 p.). (read online) (open access)
- Chuzeville (Sylvain). "La "ville ronde" de Jean-Antoine Morand". In: Lyon au XVIIIe: un siècle surprenant [exhibition, Lyon: Musées Gadagne, 2012]. Lyon: Musées Gadagne; Somogy, 2012. pp. 36-41. (read online) (open access)
- Chuzeville (Sylvain). "Note sur un projet alternatif à celui de Jean-Antoine Morand pour l'extension orientale de Lyon". Bulletin de la Société historique, archéologique et littéraire de Lyon, 2013. (read online) (open access)
- Dureau (Jeanne-Marie). Inventaire provisoire des papiers Morand de Jouffrey. Lyon: Lyon Municipal Archives, 1994. 165 p.
- Dureau (Jeanne-Marie), Mermet (Claude), Pérez (Marie-Félicie). Hommage à Morand, à l'occasion du prêt à usage des papiers Morand de Jouffrey [exhibition, Lyon: Municipal Archives, 1994]. Lyon: Lyon Municipal Archives, 1994. 188 p. (Coll. Les dossiers des Archives municipales de Lyon, 7) ISBN 2-908949-08-3
- Feuga (Paul). "Visite du château de Montribloud (Saint-André de Corcy, Ain)". Bulletin de la Société historique, archéologique et littéraire de Lyon, 1999 [year 1998], vol. 18, pp. 71-91.
- Hours (Henri), Nicolas (Michel). Jean-Antoine Morand, Architecte lyonnais, 1727-1794 [exhibition, Lyon: Municipal Archives, 1985]. Lyon: Lyon Municipal Archives, 1985. 52 p.
- Langlois (Françoise). Roanne, musée Joseph Déchelette, catalogue des tableaux des XVIIe-XVIIIe. Master's thesis: université Lumière-Lyon 2, 1999. 3 vols.
- Levallois-Clavel (Gilberte). Les estampes du fonds Morand XVIIe - XVIIIe aux Archives municipales de Lyon. Catalogue raisonné. Master's thesis: université Lumière-Lyon 2, 1997.
- Morand de Jouffrey (Jean Antoine Marie). "La vie et l’œuvre de Jean Antoine Morand". In Hommage à Morand, à l'occasion du prêt à usage des papiers Morand de Jouffrey. Lyon: Archives Municipales, 1994.
- Monin (Éric). Transformations paysagères temporaires. Les réjouissances publiques organisées en France à l’époque des Lumières. Thesis: école d'Architecture de Nantes, n.d.
- Perez (Marie-Félicie). "Jean-Antoine Morand, architecte lyonnais (1727-1794). À propos de l’exposition organisée par Henri Hours et Michel Nicolas, Lyon, Archives municipales, 1985". Cahiers d'histoire publiés par les Universités de Clermont-Ferrand, Grenoble et Lyon, 1986, vol. 31, no. 1, pp. 59-64.
- Perez (Marie-Félicie). "Le lotissement du couvent des célestins de Lyon à la fin du XVIIIe d’après les papiers de l’architecte Jean-Antoine Morand (1727-1794)". In Des pierres et des hommes, Hommage à Marcel Grandjean, matériaux pour une histoire de l’art monumental régional. Directed by Bisseger (Paul), Fontannaz (Monique). Lausanne: Bibliothèque historique vaudoise, 1995. pp. 407-424.
- Reynard (Pierre Claude). Ambitions Tamed: Urban Expansion in Pre-revolutionary Lyon. Montreal: McGill-Queen's University Press, 2009. xxii-264 p.
- Verjus (Anne) and Zara Davidson (Denise). Le Roman conjugal : chroniques de la vie familiale à l’époque de la Révolution et de l’Empire. Seyssel: Champ Vallon, 2011. 342 p.
