= Dommartin, Ain =

Part of Bâgé-Dommartin in Auvergne-Rhône-Alpes, France

Dommartin
- Part of Bâgé-Dommartin
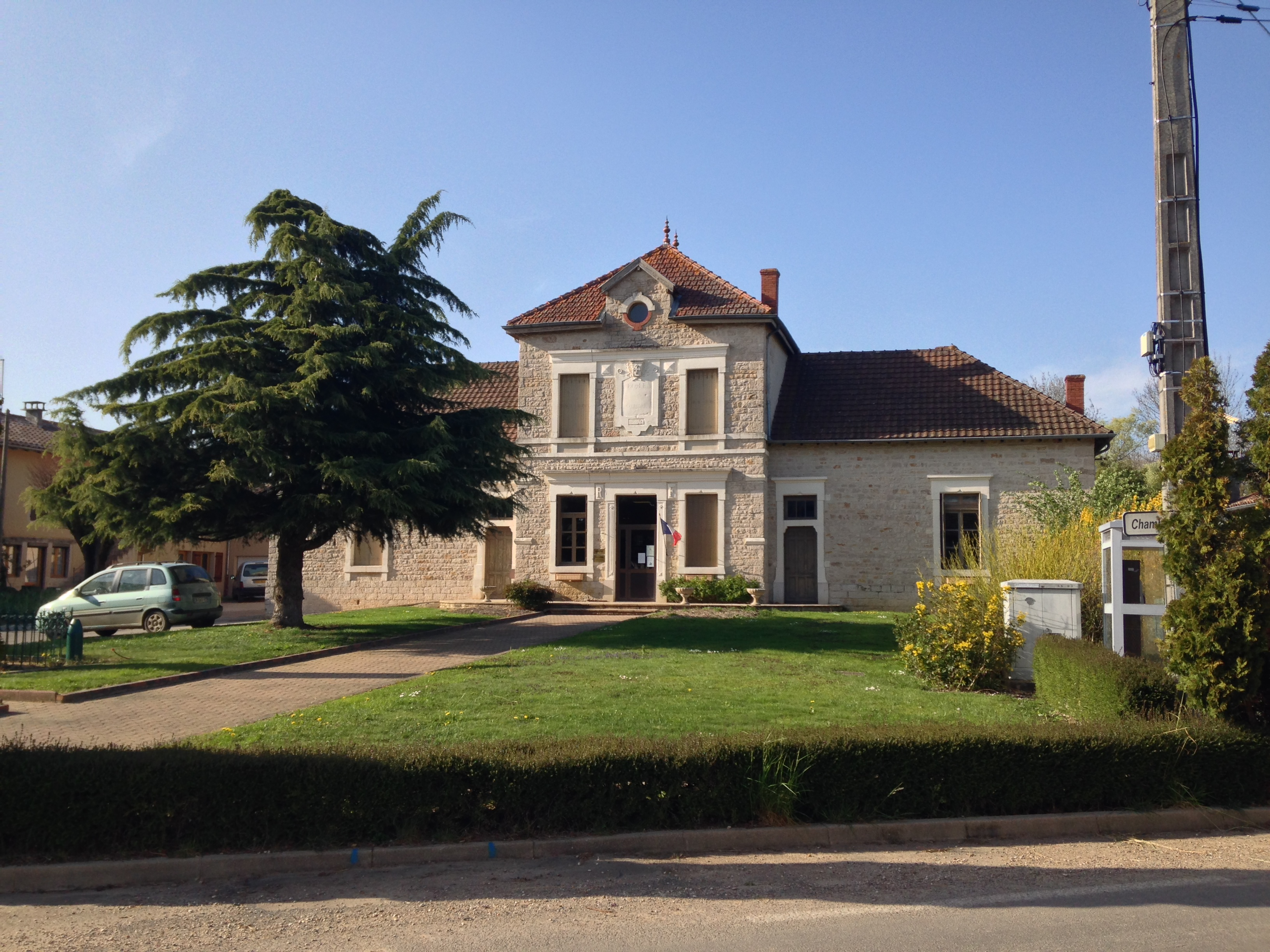
- Town hall
- Location of Dommartin
- Location within France Location within Auvergne-Rhône-Alpes
- Coordinates: 46°20′18″N 4°59′26″E
- Country: France
- Region: Auvergne-Rhône-Alpes
- Department: Ain
- Arrondissement: Bourg-en-Bresse
- Canton: Replonges
- Commune: Bâgé-Dommartin
- Area^{1}: 17.19 km^{2} (6.64 sq mi)
- Elevation: 200 m (660 ft)
- Highest elevation: 217 m (712 ft)
- Lowest elevation: 186 m (610 ft)
- Population (2022): 885
  - Density: 51.5/km^{2} (133/sq mi)
- Time zone: UTC+01:00 (CET)
  - Summer (DST): UTC+02:00 (CEST)
- Postal code: 01380
- ^{1} French Land Register data, which excludes lakes, ponds, glaciers > 1 km^{2} (0.386 sq mi or 247 acres) and river estuaries.

Dommartin (French pronunciation: [dɔ̃maʁtɛ̃]) is a former commune in the Ain department in central-eastern France. On 1 January 2018, it was merged into the new commune of Bâgé-Dommartin.

== Population ==
Historical population
| Year | Pop. | ±% p.a. |
|---|---|---|
| 2006 | 756 | — |
| 2011 | 857 | +2.54% |
| 2015 | 886 | +0.84% |
| 2022 | 885 | −0.02% |
Source: INSEE

== See also ==
- Communes of the Ain department
