= Château de Montribloud =

Former castle in Saint-André-de-Corcy, France

Coordinates: 45°55′01″N 4°54′52″E

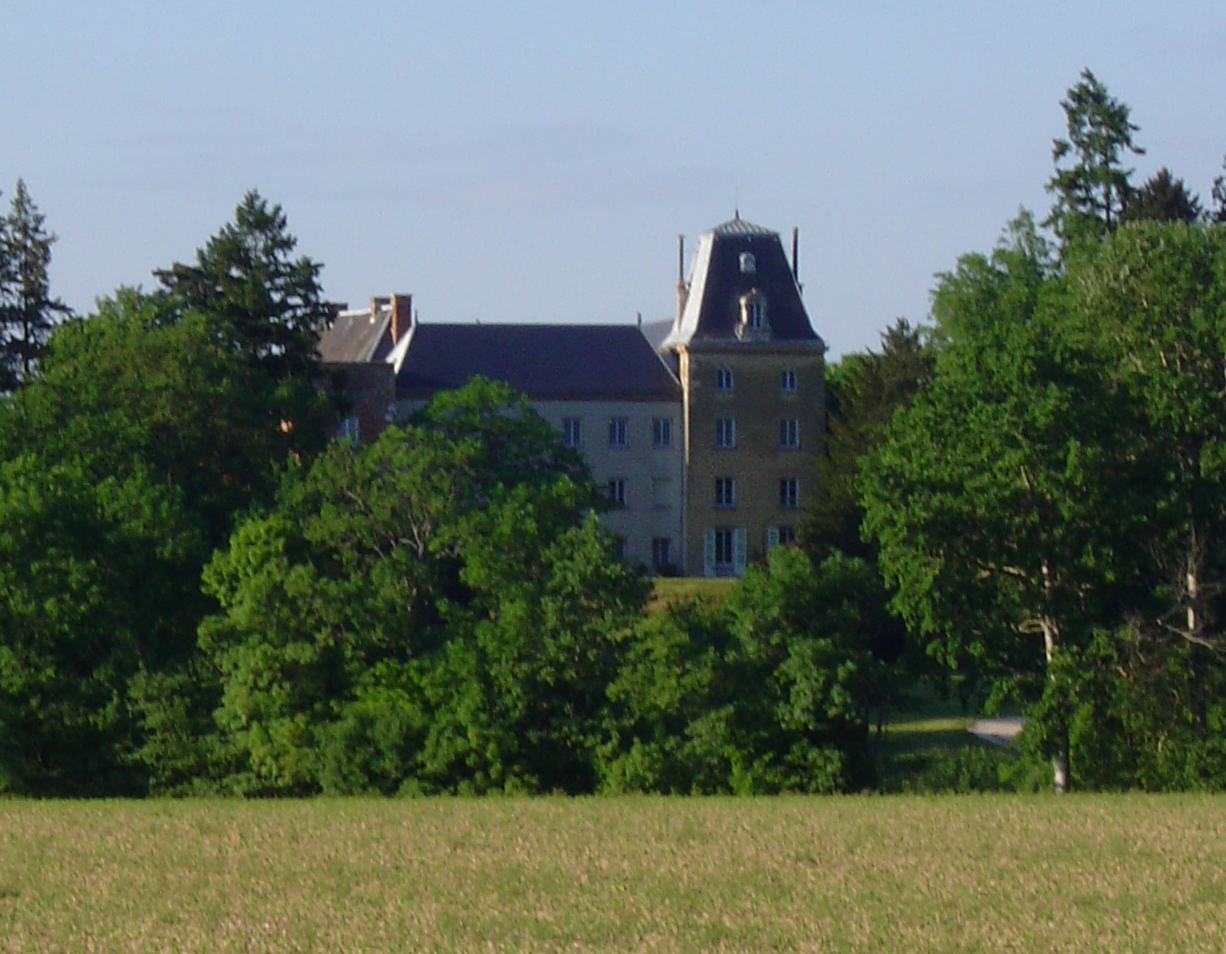
Château de Montribloud

The Château de Montribloud is a former castle in the commune of Saint-André-de-Corcy in the Ain département of France. It was later transformed into a Renaissance château.

The castle is constructed of brick, typical of the Dombes area.

== Origins ==
The origin of Montribloud is uncertain. Some have derived the name of Montribloud from Mons terribilis (terrible mount) as the site of a battle in 197 BC between Clodius Albinus and Septimius Severus to become Roman Emperor. Others suggest a Germanic origin, citing ancient transcriptions referring to "Montribloz, Montriblou, Montriblout".

== Middle Ages ==
The first proven historical mention of Montribloud dates back to 1299. In 1313, Hugues Brun, canon of Lyon Cathedral, directed his heirs to build a monastery there. In fact, Humbert V, lord of Thoire-Villars, built a castle on a mound during the 1320s. On 21 February 1334, Humbert V paid homage to the Dauphin du Viennois for the "donjon" (keep) of Montribloud. Later, his son Humbert VI, did the same Amadeus VI, Count of Savoy in 1355, following the joining of Dauphiné to France.

On 31 October 1384, Humbert VII of Thoire-Villars exchanged the territory of Beauvoir en Bugey with Eudes de Villars, seigneur of Montellier, his cousin, for the seigneurie of Montribloud including the parishes of Saint-André-de-Corcy, Civrieux, Bussiges and Saint-Marcel-en-Dombes.

At the beginning of the 15th century, after the death without heirs of Eudes de Villars, Montribloud passed in 1418 to his grand-nephews, the sons of Jeanne de la Tour and of Jean de La Baume, Count of de Montrevel and Marshal of France. It remained in this powerful Baume-Montrevel family until Antoine, who sold it in 1590, to Martin and Jean de Covet, seigneurs of la Mure, rich merchant drapers originally from Bresse.

== The Renaissance château ==
The Covets transformed the castle, surrounded with ditches, into a Renaissance residence with mullioned windows. On 8 August 1660, Antoine de Covet, marquis de Villars, had the barony of Montibould established in the county. Deeply in debt, his grandson Jean-Baptiste de Covet, was forced to sell the seigneurie of Montribloud to his creditor, Pierre Nicolau, alderman and treasurer of the town of Lyon. on 24 January 1754.

== The château of the Nicolaus ==
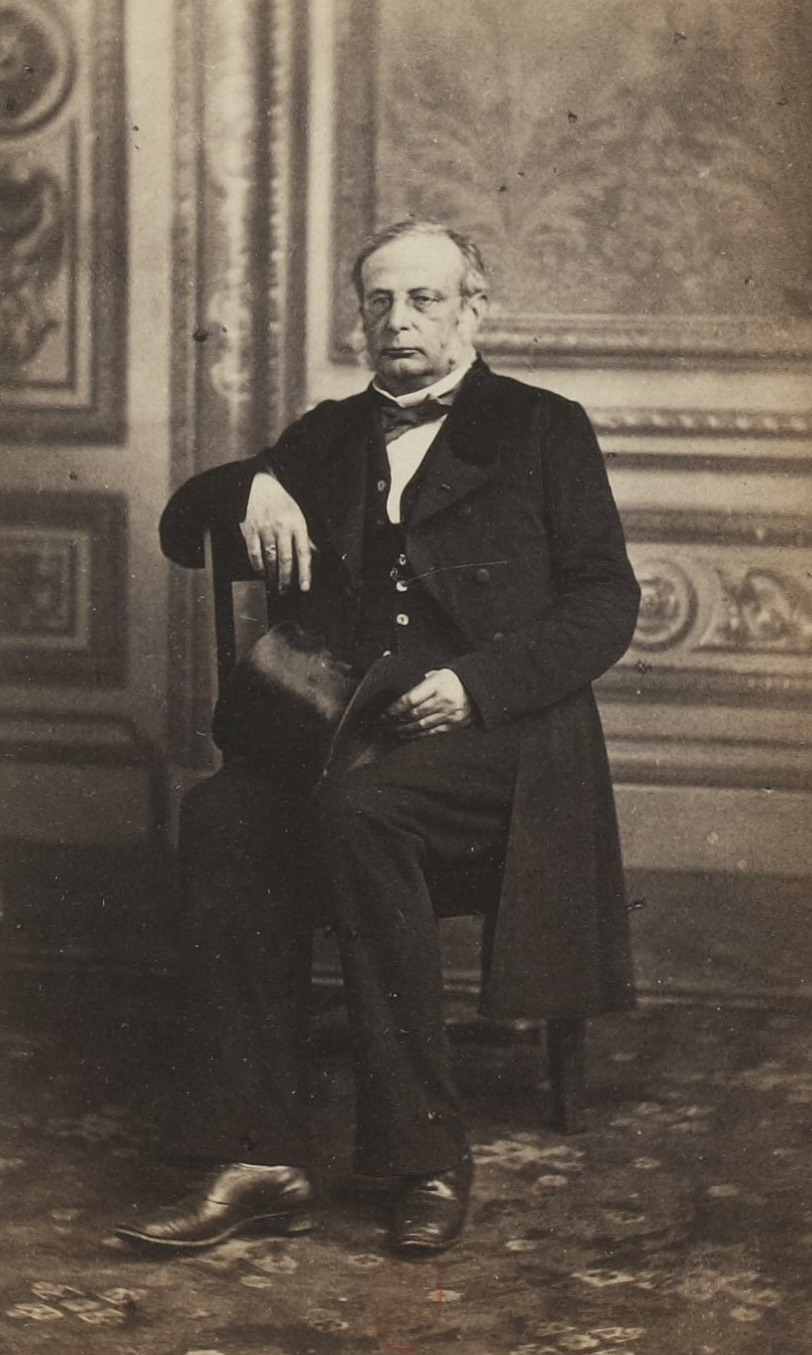
Alexandre Bodin.

Inheriting the château from his father, Christophe Nicolau engaged the celebrated Lyonnais urban architect Jean-Antoine Morand to rebuild the castle to his tastes. The mound was enlarged, the castle was given a neoclassical plan and a French formal garden was created. But, accused of having mixed his personal funds with those of the town of Lyon, he fled to Paris.

His son, Antoine Nicolau, gave it to the Lyonnais banker Melchior Bodin in 1826. His son, Alexandre Bodin (1804-1893), who became député for l'Ain and a member of the Corps Législatif under the Second Empire), transformed the appearance of the castle by introducing slate roofs, according to the fashion of the time, and remodelled the gardens in the English landscape style. The present château has changed very little since then and still belongs to the Bodin family.

== The château in the 21st century ==
The château is normally closed to the public. During European Heritage Days, the Bodin family open the château to visitors.

== Sources ==
Guigue, Marie-Claude, Topographie historique du département de l'Ain, 1873.

== See also ==
- List of castles in France
