= Jean-François Debat =

French politician (born 1966)

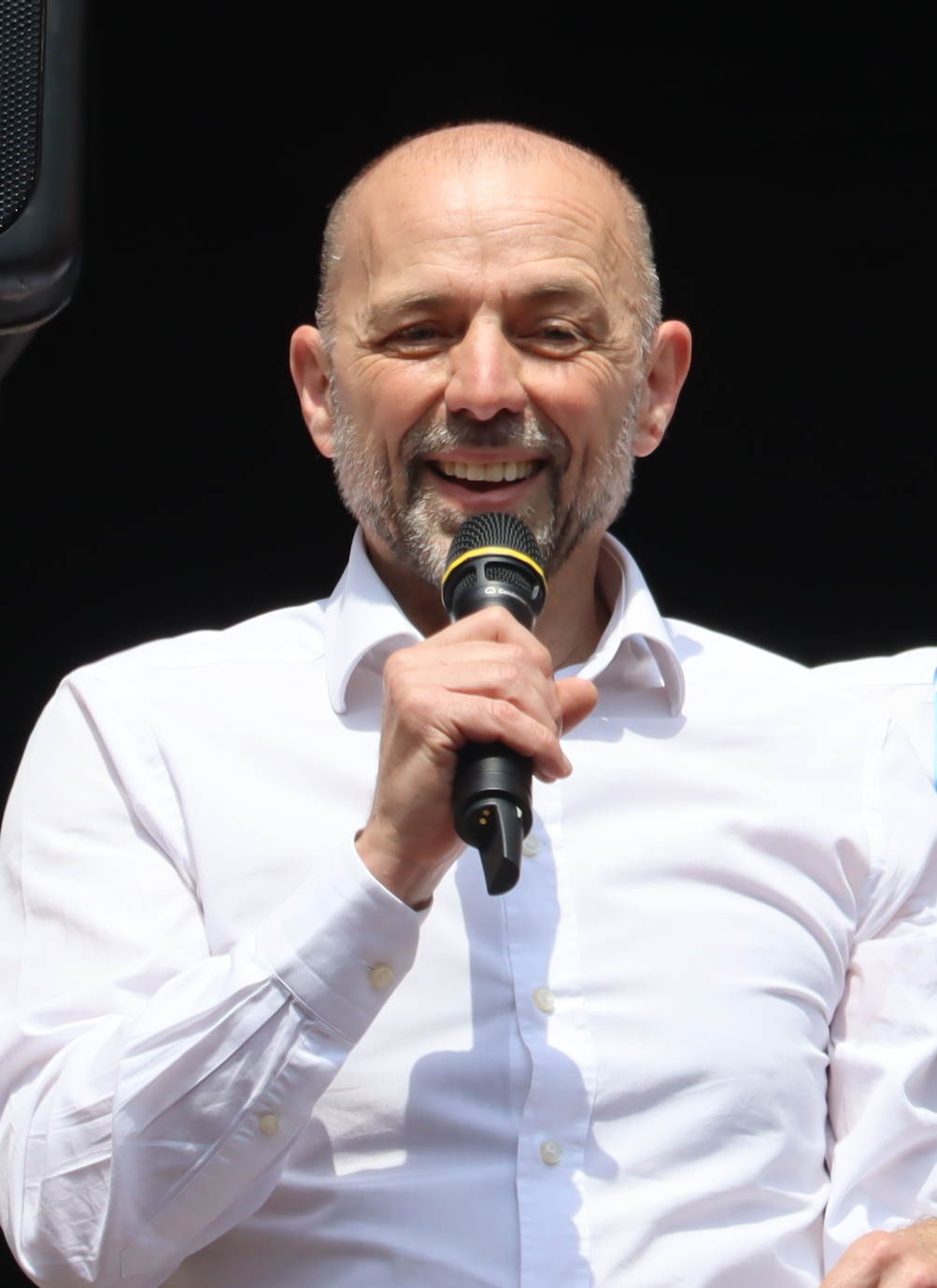
- Debat in 2026

Mayor of Bourg-en-Bresse
- Incumbent
- Assumed office 14 March 2008
- Preceded by: Jean-Michel Bertrand

Personal details
- Born: 24 January 1966 (age 60)
- Party: Socialist Party

Jean-François Debat (born 24 January 1966) is a French politician serving as mayor of Bourg-en-Bresse since 2008. He concurrently serves as president of Bassin de Bourg-en-Bresse since 2017. He has been a member of the Regional Council of Auvergne-Rhône-Alpes since 2004, and served as vice president for finance from 2005 to 2015.
