= Feillens =

Commune in Auvergne-Rhône-Alpes, France

- Commune
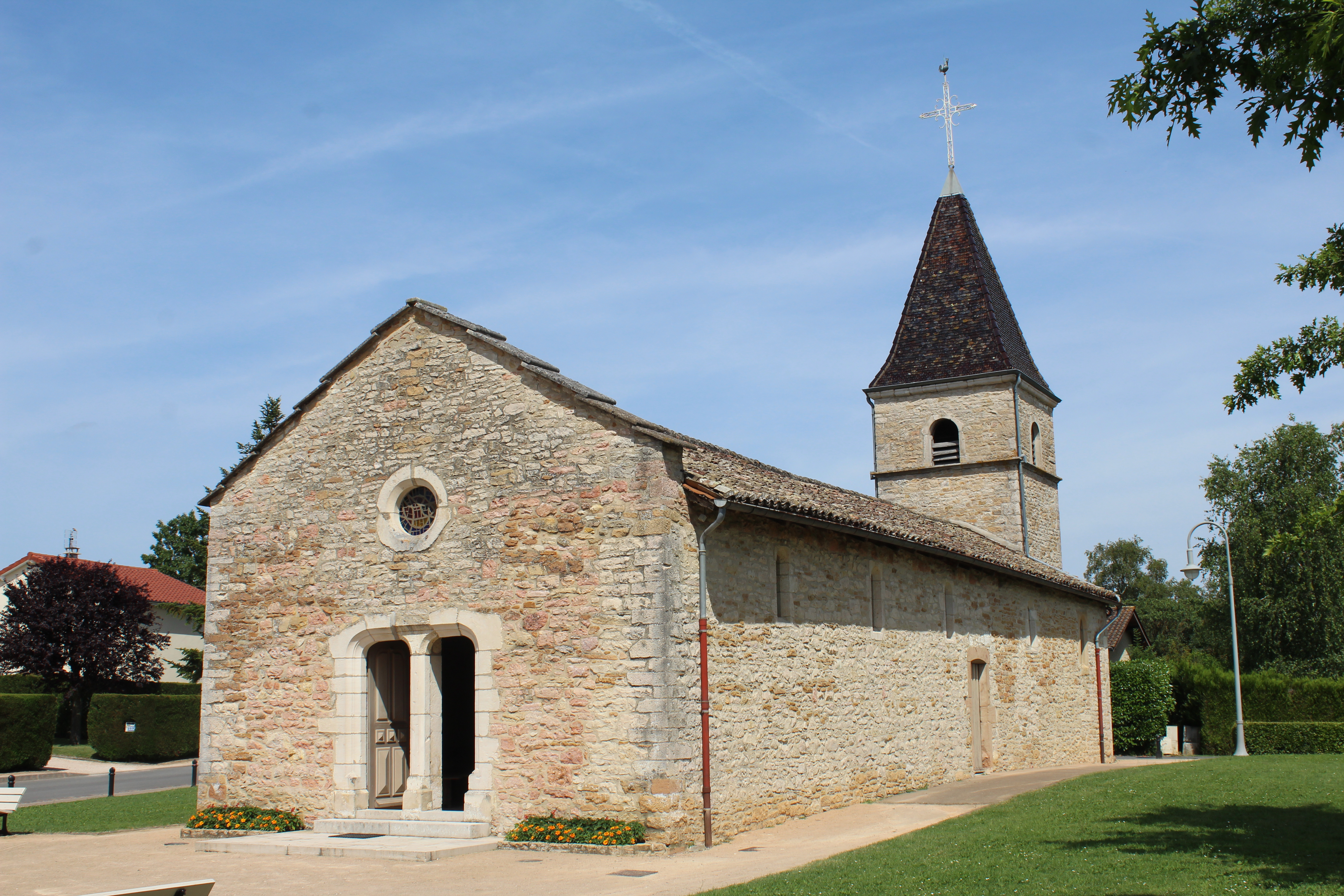

- Coat of arms
- Location of Feillens
- Location within France Location within Auvergne-Rhône-Alpes
- Coordinates: 46°20′12″N 4°53′30″E
- Country: France
- Region: Auvergne-Rhône-Alpes
- Department: Ain
- Arrondissement: Bourg-en-Bresse
- Canton: Replonges
- Intercommunality: Bresse et Saône

Government
  - Mayor (2026–32): Arnaud Delalande
- Area^{1}: 14.91 km^{2} (5.76 sq mi)
- Elevation: 180 m (590 ft)
- Highest elevation: 207 m (679 ft)
- Lowest elevation: 169 m (554 ft)
- Population (2023): 3,411
  - Density: 228.8/km^{2} (592.5/sq mi)
- Time zone: UTC+01:00 (CET)
  - Summer (DST): UTC+02:00 (CEST)
- INSEE/Postal code: 01159 /01570
- ^{1} French Land Register data, which excludes lakes, ponds, glaciers > 1 km^{2} (0.386 sq mi or 247 acres) and river estuaries.

Feillens (French pronunciation: [fɛjɑ̃]) is a commune in the Ain department in eastern France.

== Population ==
Historical population

Year	Pop.	±% p.a.
1793	2,286	—
1800	1,418	−6.59%
1806	2,227	+7.81%
1821	2,422	+0.56%
1831	2,526	+0.42%
1836	2,590	+0.50%
1841	2,647	+0.44%
1846	2,684	+0.28%
1851	2,720	+0.27%
1856	2,738	+0.13%
1861	2,704	−0.25%
1866	2,658	−0.34%
1872	2,648	−0.06%
1876	2,669	+0.20%
1881	2,608	−0.46%
1886	2,591	−0.13%
1891	2,553	−0.30%
1896	2,478	−0.59%
1901	2,423	−0.45%

Year	Pop.	±% p.a.
1906	2,421	−0.02%
1911	2,333	−0.74%
1921	2,137	−0.87%
1926	2,075	−0.59%
1931	2,024	−0.50%
1936	2,071	+0.46%
1946	2,086	+0.07%
1954	2,153	+0.40%
1962	2,296	+0.81%
1968	2,538	+1.68%
1975	2,605	+0.37%
1982	2,595	−0.05%
1990	2,624	+0.14%
1999	2,933	+1.24%
2007	3,110	+0.74%
2012	3,147	+0.24%
2017	3,291	+0.90%
2023	3,411	+0.60%

Source: EHESS and INSEE (1968-2023)

== See also ==
- Communes of the Ain department
