= Lagnieu =

Commune in Auvergne-Rhône-Alpes, France

Lagnieu Lagniœ (Arpitan)
- Commune
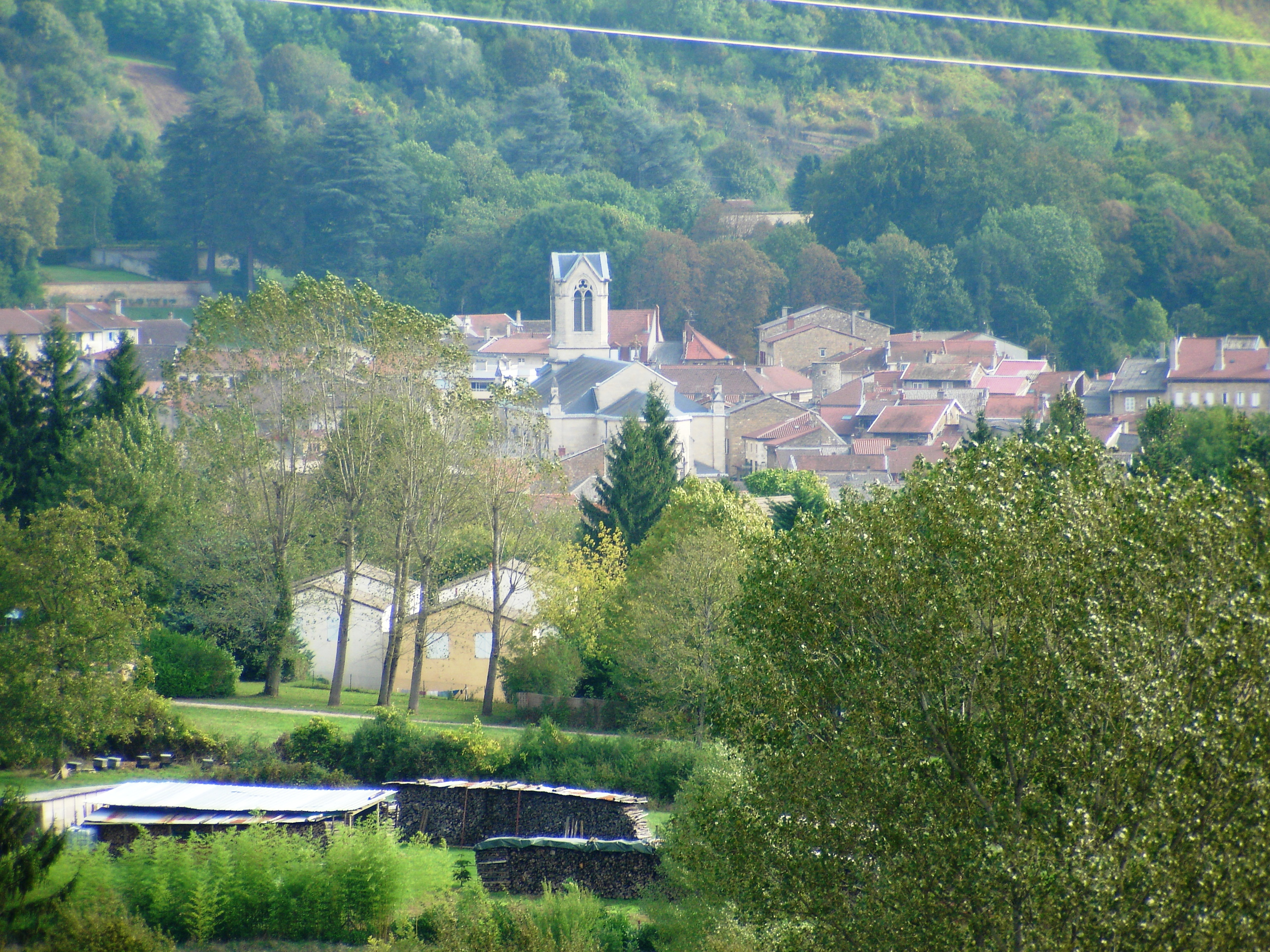

- Coat of arms
- Location of Lagnieu
- Location within France Location within Auvergne-Rhône-Alpes
- Coordinates: 45°54′11″N 5°20′53″E
- Country: France
- Region: Auvergne-Rhône-Alpes
- Department: Ain
- Arrondissement: Belley
- Canton: Lagnieu

Government
  - Mayor (2026–32): Alexandre Nanchi
- Area^{1}: 27.25 km^{2} (10.52 sq mi)
- Elevation: 239 m (784 ft)
- Highest elevation: 643 m (2,110 ft)
- Lowest elevation: 192 m (630 ft)
- Population (2023): 7,411
  - Density: 272.0/km^{2} (704.4/sq mi)
- Time zone: UTC+01:00 (CET)
  - Summer (DST): UTC+02:00 (CEST)
- INSEE/Postal code: 01202 /01150
- ^{1} French Land Register data, which excludes lakes, ponds, glaciers > 1 km^{2} (0.386 sq mi or 247 acres) and river estuaries.

Lagnieu (French pronunciation: [laɲø]; Arpitan: Lagniœ) is a commune in the Ain department in eastern France.

== Geography ==
Lagnieu is located in the south of the department of Ain, on the right bank of the Rhone, 50 km northeast of Lyon and 37 km south of Bourg-en-Bresse. The town belongs to the canton of Lagnieu, of which it is the seat, and the arrondissement of Belley.

Attached to the foothills of southern Jura (Bugey), it belongs to the natural region of the plain of Ain, also name of the industrial park established about ten kilometers west of the town. Its territory has an altitude ranging from 192 m to 643 m, the town hall is 212 m.

== History ==
According to a Latin text of the seventh century, Lagnieu derives from a landowner named Latinus, giving his name to the district and become Latiniacus.

Around 1430, the inhabitants of Lagnieu seized six oxen belonging to the monks of the Carthusian monastery of Portes and ravaged their crops by releasing their pigs.

During the French Revolution, Lagnieu took the revolutionary name of Fontaine-d'Or.

In 1957, during the passage of a metal element intended for the Marcoule nuclear power plant, the "centipede", the Lagnieu fountain was accidentally destroyed.

== Geology ==
The territory presents a seismic risk as well as natural and technological risks such as flood, dam break, industrial and nuclear risks, transport of dangerous goods. Several natural disasters have occurred in the past such as floods and mudslides (April 30 and May 1, 1983, September 26, 1987, October 9 to 12, 1988, February 13 to 18, 1990, June 25, 2006

== Climate ==
Lagnieu, like the Lyon region, is located at a climatic crossroads. The climate is of a semi-continental type with Mediterranean aspects, especially in summer. Several southern species are present, including the Montpellier pistachio or several species of cicadas. [ref. necessary]

The absence of wind in summer contributes to the stifling summer days in the Latini area and more generally Lyon.

== Population ==
The population data given in the table and graph below for 1962 and earlier are excluding the former commune of Proulieu, absorbed in 1965.

Historical population

| Year | Pop. | ±% p.a. |
|---|---|---|
| 1793 | 2,107 | — |
| 1800 | 2,551 | +2.77% |
| 1806 | 2,304 | −1.68% |
| 1821 | 2,411 | +0.30% |
| 1831 | 2,285 | −0.54% |
| 1836 | 2,354 | +0.60% |
| 1841 | 2,531 | +1.46% |
| 1846 | 2,673 | +1.10% |
| 1851 | 2,900 | +1.64% |
| 1856 | 3,182 | +1.87% |
| 1861 | 3,317 | +0.83% |
| 1866 | 3,259 | −0.35% |
| 1872 | 2,770 | −2.67% |
| 1876 | 2,796 | +0.23% |
| 1881 | 2,638 | −1.16% |
| 1886 | 2,629 | −0.07% |
| 1891 | 2,488 | −1.10% |
| 1896 | 2,347 | −1.16% |
| 1901 | 2,332 | −0.13% |

| Year | Pop. | ±% p.a. |
|---|---|---|
| 1906 | 2,202 | −1.14% |
| 1911 | 2,238 | +0.32% |
| 1921 | 2,016 | −1.04% |
| 1926 | 2,230 | +2.04% |
| 1931 | 2,295 | +0.58% |
| 1936 | 2,216 | −0.70% |
| 1946 | 2,178 | −0.17% |
| 1954 | 2,297 | +0.67% |
| 1962 | 3,082 | +3.74% |
| 1968 | 4,162 | +5.13% |
| 1975 | 5,208 | +3.25% |
| 1982 | 5,594 | +1.03% |
| 1990 | 5,686 | +0.20% |
| 1999 | 5,882 | +0.38% |
| 2007 | 6,697 | +1.64% |
| 2012 | 6,789 | +0.27% |
| 2017 | 7,143 | +1.02% |
| 2023 | 7,411 | +0.62% |

Source: EHESS and INSEE

== Politics ==
List of successive mayors of Lagnieu

| From | To | Name |
|---|---|---|
| 1953 | 1963 | Eugène Jacquier |
| 1963 | 1995 | Guy de la Verpillière |
| 1995 | 2004 | Charles de la Verpillière |
| 2004 | 2014 | André Moingeon |
| 2014 | 2020 | Laurent Girard |
| 2020 | 2026 | André Moingeon |
| 2026 | incumbent | Alexandre Nanchi |

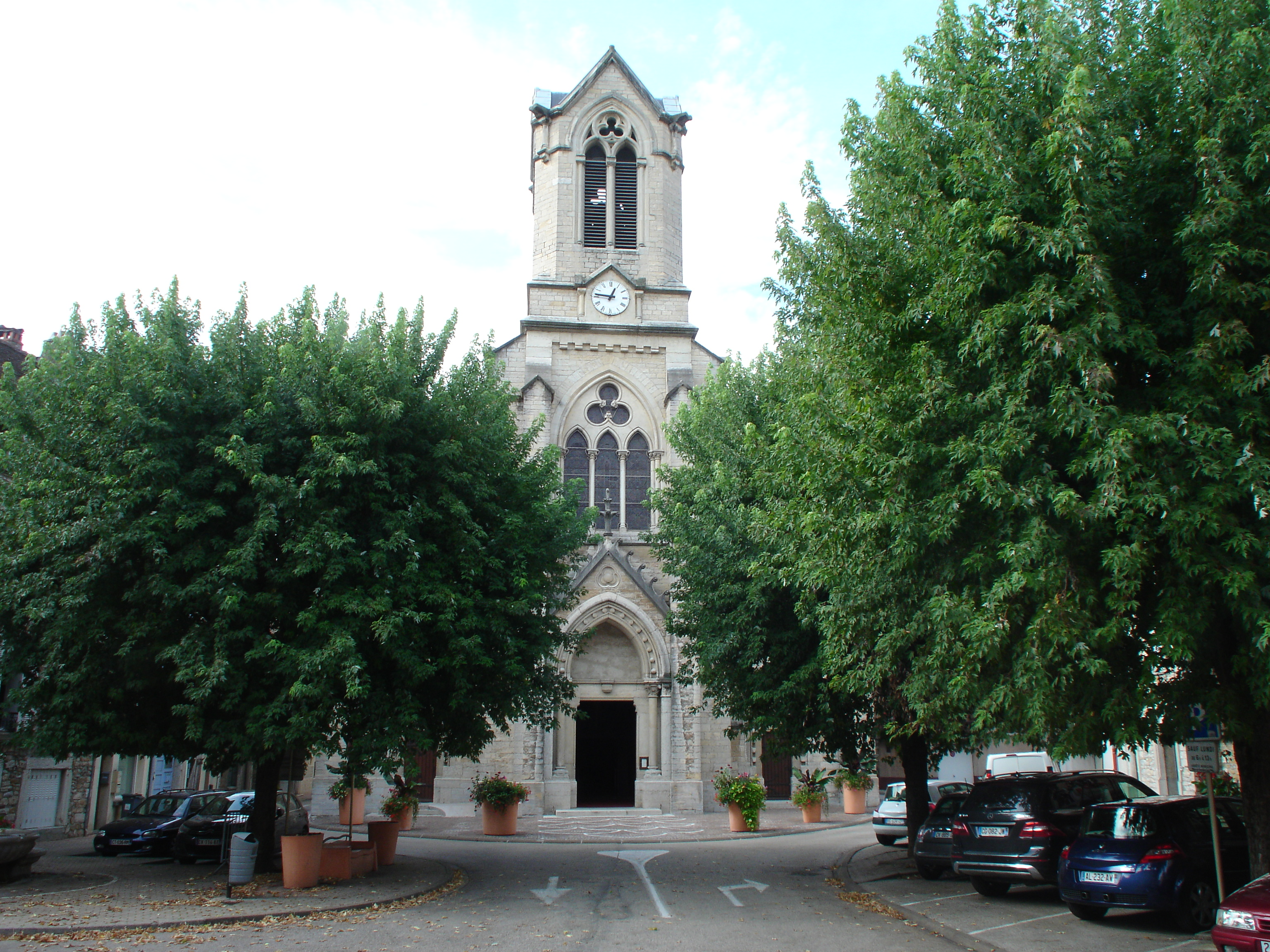
Church of Saint John the Baptist, built from 1867-1870)

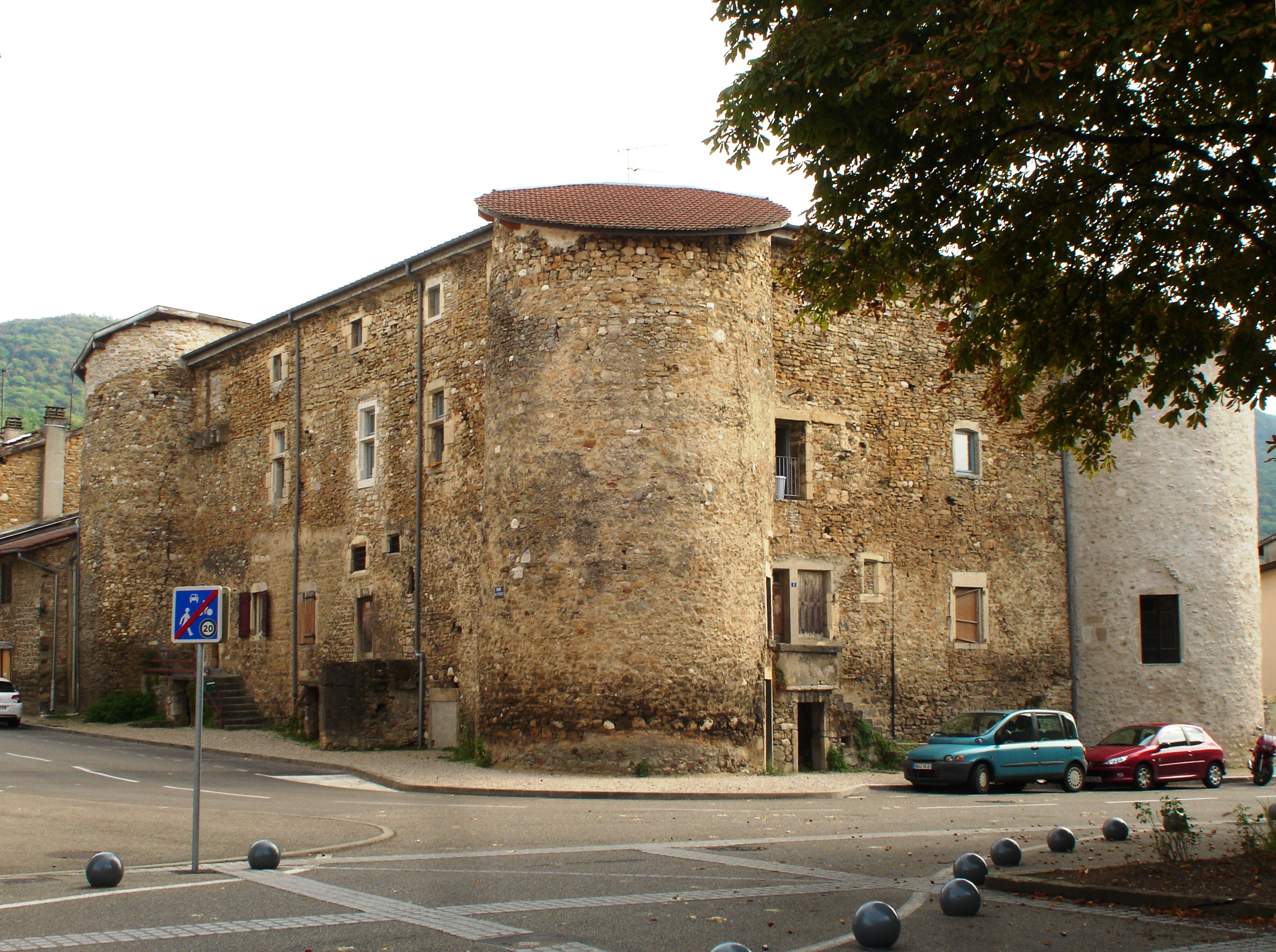
Château built by Claude de Montferrand in 1471

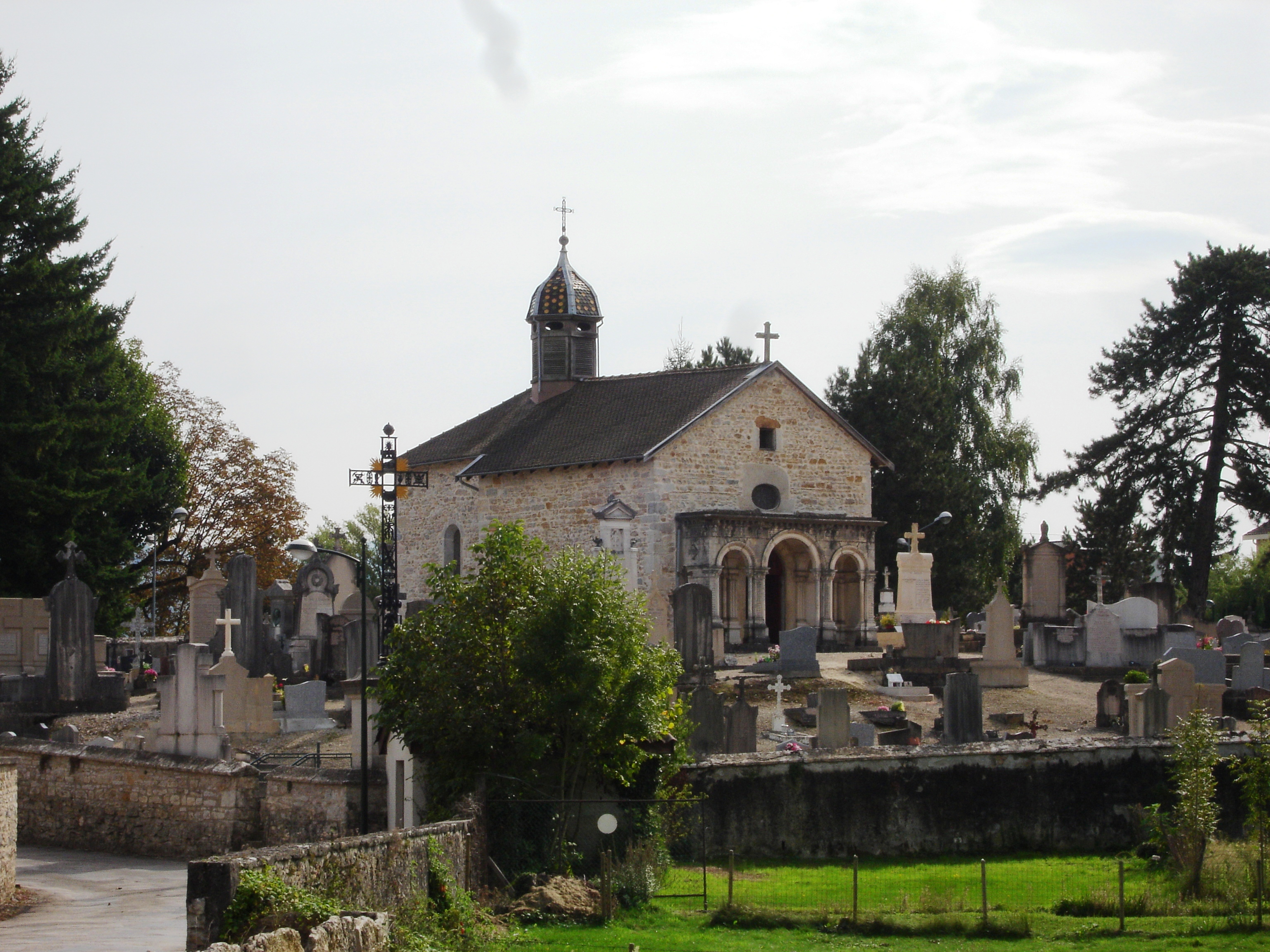
Chapel of Plastre-de-là-Croix, cemetery

== See also ==
- Communes of the Ain department
