= Bâgé-la-Ville =

Part of Bâgé-Dommartin in Auvergne-Rhône-Alpes, France

- Part of Bâgé-Dommartin
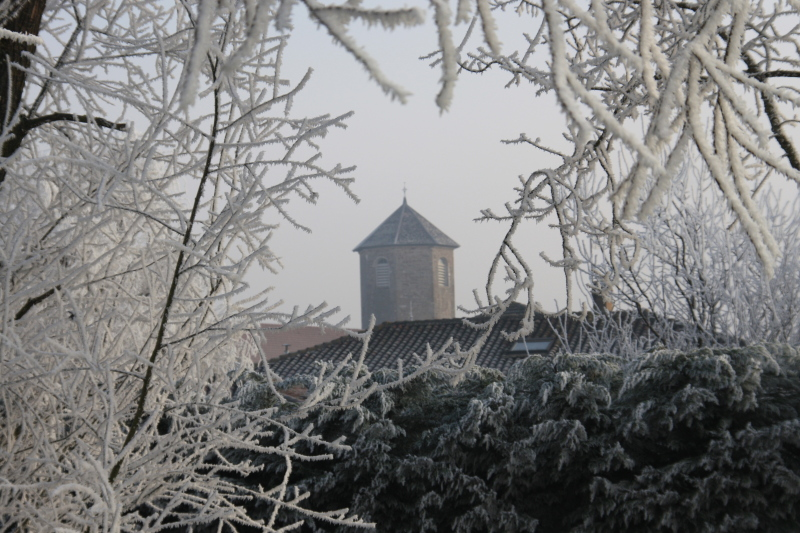

- Coat of arms
- Location of Bâgé-la-Ville
- Location within France Location within Auvergne-Rhône-Alpes
- Coordinates: 46°19′00″N 4°57′00″E
- Country: France
- Region: Auvergne-Rhône-Alpes
- Department: Ain
- Arrondissement: Bourg-en-Bresse
- Canton: Replonges
- Commune: Bâgé-Dommartin
- Area^{1}: 39.68 km^{2} (15.32 sq mi)
- Elevation: 212 m (696 ft)
- Highest elevation: 217 m (712 ft)
- Lowest elevation: 179 m (587 ft)
- Population (2022): 3,172
  - Density: 79.94/km^{2} (207.0/sq mi)
- Time zone: UTC+01:00 (CET)
  - Summer (DST): UTC+02:00 (CEST)
- Postal code: 01380
- ^{1} French Land Register data, which excludes lakes, ponds, glaciers > 1 km^{2} (0.386 sq mi or 247 acres) and river estuaries.

Bâgé-la-Ville (French pronunciation: [baʒe la vil]; Arpitan: Bâgiê-la-Vela) is a former commune in the Ain department in central-eastern France. On 1 January 2018, it was merged into the new commune of Bâgé-Dommartin.

== Geography ==
Bâgé-la-Ville is in the heart of Bresse, between Bourg-en-Bresse and Mâcon. It was the largest commune in the department in terms of area.

== Population ==
Historical population
Year	Pop.	±% p.a.
1962	1,399	—
1968	1,383	−0.19%
1975	1,361	−0.23%
1982	1,596	+2.30%
1990	1,959	+2.59%
1999	2,314	+1.87%
2006	2,532	+1.29%
2010	3,040	+4.68%
2015	3,177	+0.89%
2022	3,172	−0.02%
Source: EHESS and INSEE (2010-2022)

== See also ==
- Communes of the Ain department

== Personalities ==
- Louis Duret, court physician
