= Saint-André-de-Corcy =

Commune in Auvergne-Rhône-Alpes, France

- Commune
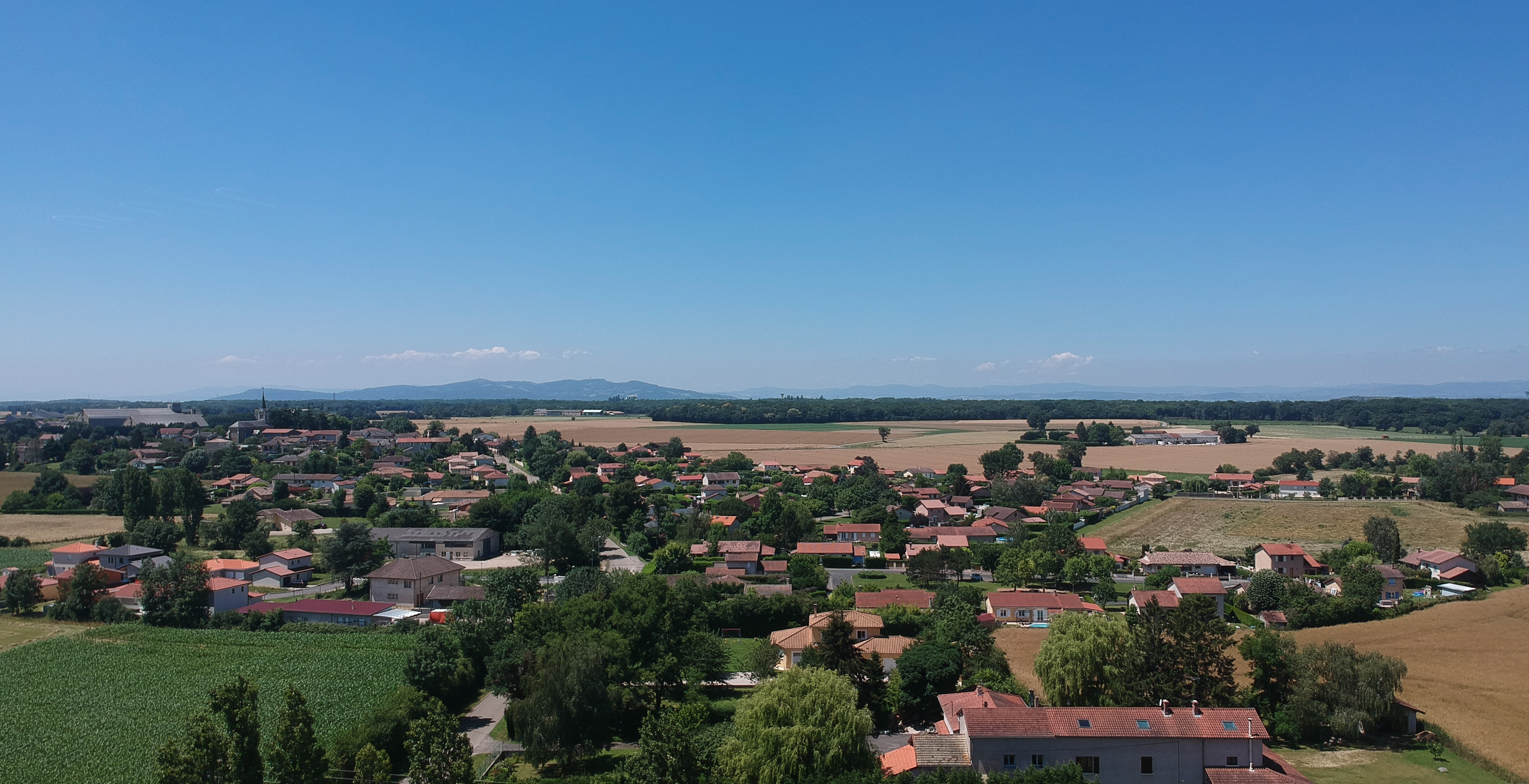
- Location of Saint-André-de-Corcy
- Location within France Location within Auvergne-Rhône-Alpes
- Coordinates: 45°55′38″N 4°57′10″E
- Country: France
- Region: Auvergne-Rhône-Alpes
- Department: Ain
- Arrondissement: Bourg-en-Bresse
- Canton: Villars-les-Dombes

Government
  - Mayor (2026–32): Claude Lefever
- Area^{1}: 20.73 km^{2} (8.00 sq mi)
- Elevation: 296 m (971 ft)
- Highest elevation: 306 m (1,004 ft)
- Lowest elevation: 279 m (915 ft)
- Population (2023): 3,370
  - Density: 163/km^{2} (421/sq mi)
- Time zone: UTC+01:00 (CET)
  - Summer (DST): UTC+02:00 (CEST)
- INSEE/Postal code: 01333 /01390
- ^{1} French Land Register data, which excludes lakes, ponds, glaciers > 1 km^{2} (0.386 sq mi or 247 acres) and river estuaries.

Saint-André-de-Corcy (French pronunciation: [sɛ̃.t‿ɑ̃dʁe də kɔʁsi]) is a commune in the Ain département in eastern France.

== Population ==
Historical population
Year	Pop.	±% p.a.
1968	780	—
1975	900	+2.07%
1982	2,131	+13.10%
1990	2,547	+2.25%
1999	3,101	+2.21%
2007	2,992	−0.45%
2012	2,959	−0.22%
2017	3,354	+2.54%
2023	3,370	+0.08%
Source: INSEE

== Sites and monuments ==
The commune has several châteaux and poypes (fortified mounds, or mottes). The motte castrale Poype de la Roussière has been listed as monument historique by the French Ministry of Culture since 1989. The Château de Montribloud a castle converted to a residence, dates from the 14th century.

== See also ==
- Communes of the Ain department
