= Villieu-Loyes-Mollon =

Commune in Auvergne-Rhône-Alpes, France

Villieu-Loyes-Mollon Velyô-Louyes-Molon (Arpitan)
- Commune
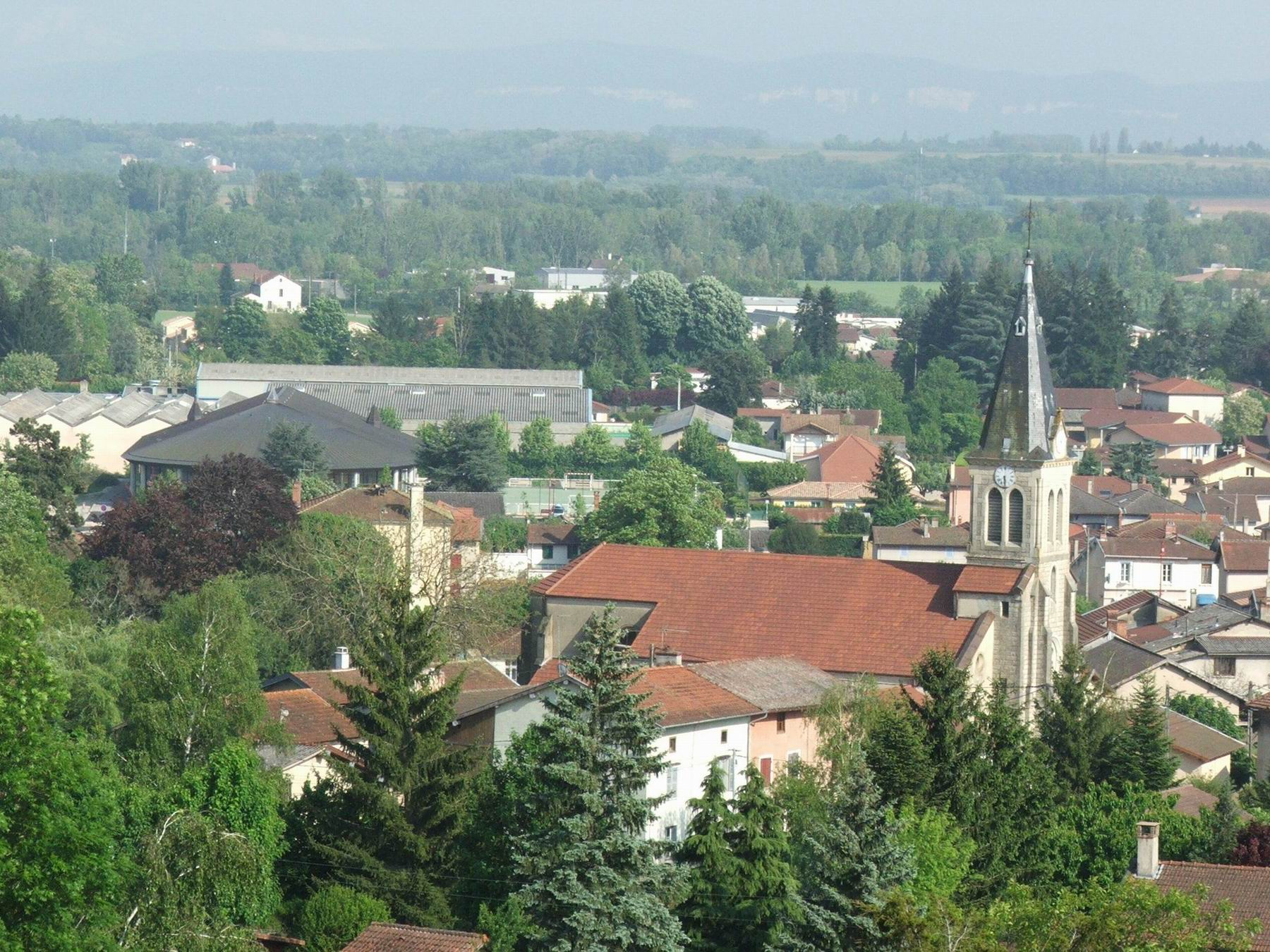
- Location of Villieu-Loyes-Mollon
- Location within France Location within Auvergne-Rhône-Alpes
- Coordinates: 45°55′31″N 5°13′17″E
- Country: France
- Region: Auvergne-Rhône-Alpes
- Department: Ain
- Arrondissement: Belley
- Canton: Lagnieu
- Intercommunality: Plaine de l'Ain

Government
  - Mayor (2020–2026): Eric Beaufort
- Area^{1}: 15.91 km^{2} (6.14 sq mi)
- Highest elevation: 298 m (978 ft)
- Lowest elevation: 220 m (720 ft)
- Population (2023): 3,849
  - Density: 241.9/km^{2} (626.6/sq mi)
- Time zone: UTC+01:00 (CET)
  - Summer (DST): UTC+02:00 (CEST)
- INSEE/Postal code: 01450 /01800
- ^{1} French Land Register data, which excludes lakes, ponds, glaciers > 1 km^{2} (0.386 sq mi or 247 acres) and river estuaries.

Villieu-Loyes-Mollon (French pronunciation: [viljø lwa mɔlɔ̃]; Arpitan: Velyô-Louyes-Molon) is a commune in the Ain department in eastern France. It lies between Meximieux and Pont-d'Ain.

Villieu-Loyes-Mollon is the result of the merger of three former communes Villieu, Loyes and Mollon in 1974.

== Population ==
Population data refer to the commune in its geography as of January 2025.

Historical population
Year	Pop.	±% p.a.
1968	1,176	—
1975	1,512	+3.66%
1982	1,801	+2.53%
1990	2,182	+2.43%
1999	2,407	+1.10%
2007	2,790	+1.86%
2012	3,200	+2.78%
2017	3,653	+2.68%
2023	3,849	+0.87%
Source: INSEE

== Twin cities ==
- Dobřichovice, Czech Republic

== See also ==
- Communes of the Ain department
