= Bâgé-Dommartin =

Commune in Auvergne-Rhône-Alpes, France

- Commune
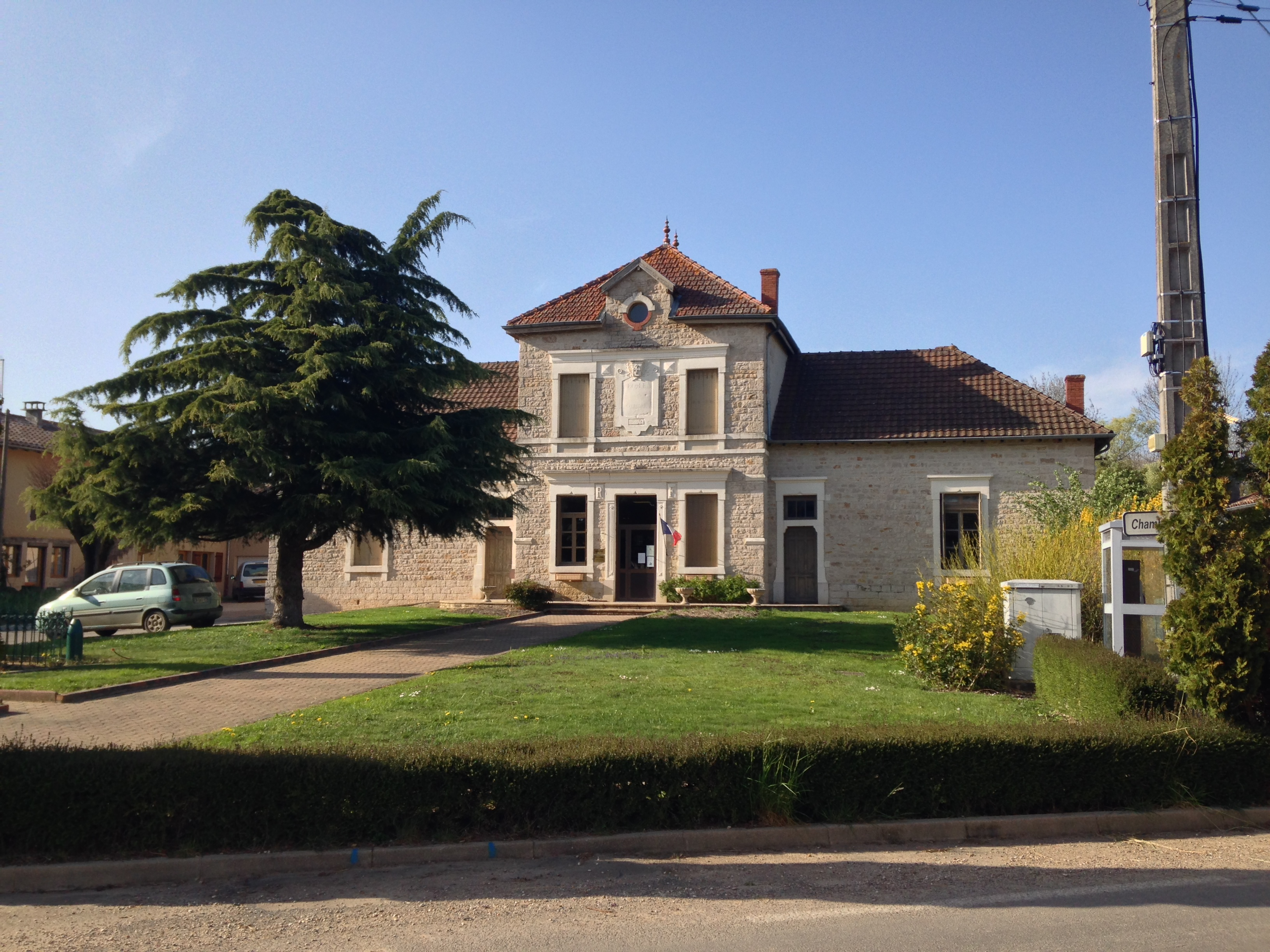
- Town hall of Dommartin

- Coat of arms
- Location of Bâgé-Dommartin
- Location within France Location within Auvergne-Rhône-Alpes
- Coordinates: 46°19′00″N 4°57′00″E
- Country: France
- Region: Auvergne-Rhône-Alpes
- Department: Ain
- Arrondissement: Bourg-en-Bresse
- Canton: Replonges
- Intercommunality: Bresse et Saône

Government
  - Mayor (2026–32): Christian Bernigaud
- Area^{1}: 56.87 km^{2} (21.96 sq mi)
- Population (2023): 4,050
  - Density: 71.2/km^{2} (184/sq mi)
- Time zone: UTC+01:00 (CET)
  - Summer (DST): UTC+02:00 (CEST)
- INSEE/Postal code: 01025 /01380
- Website: https://bage-dommartin.fr/
- ^{1} French Land Register data, which excludes lakes, ponds, glaciers > 1 km^{2} (0.386 sq mi or 247 acres) and river estuaries.

Bâgé-Dommartin (French pronunciation: [baʒe dɔmaʁtɛ̃]) is a commune in the Ain department of eastern France. The municipality was established on 1 January 2018 and consists of the former communes of Bâgé-la-Ville and Dommartin.

== Population ==
Population data refer to the commune in its geography as of January 2025.

Historical population
Year	Pop.	±% p.a.
1968	1,981	—
1975	1,889	−0.68%
1982	2,113	+1.61%
1990	2,496	+2.10%
1999	2,914	+1.74%
2007	3,534	+2.44%
2012	4,002	+2.52%
2017	4,092	+0.45%
2023	4,050	−0.17%
Source: INSEE

== See also ==
- Communes of the Ain department
